= List of performance analysis tools =

This is a list of performance analysis tools for use in software development.

== General purpose, language independent ==
The following tools work based on log files that can be generated from various systems.

- time (Unix) - can be used to determine the run time of a program, separately counting user time vs. system time, and CPU time vs. clock time.
- timem (Unix) - can be used to determine the wall-clock time, CPU time, and CPU utilization similar to time (Unix) but supports numerous extensions.
  - Supports reporting peak resident set size, major and minor page faults, priority and voluntary context switches via getrusage.
  - Supports sampling procfs on supporting systems to report metrics such as page-based resident set size, virtual memory size, read-bytes, and write-bytes, etc.
  - Supports collecting hardware counters when built with PAPI support.

== Multiple languages ==
The following tools work for multiple languages or binaries.

Name/manufacturer	OS	Compiler/language	What it does	License
AppDynamics by Cisco	Linux, Windows, iOS, Android, Azure, AWS, AIX	.NET, Java, PHP, HTML5, ObjectiveC/iOS, Java/Android, C/C++, Apache, Nginx, Cassandra, DataBases	See Application Performance Management.	Proprietary
Applications Manager by ManageEngine	Linux, Windows	Java, PHP, Ruby, .NET, .NET Core, Node.js.	See Application Performance Management.	Proprietary
AQtime by SmartBear Software	Windows	.NET 1.0 to 4.0 applications (including ASP.NET applications), Silverlight 4.0 applications, Windows 32- and 64-bit applications including C, C++, Delphi for Win32 and VBScript and JScript functions	Performance profiler and memory/resource debugging toolset.	Proprietary
Arm MAP	Linux	C, C++, Fortran/Fortran90 and Python applications.	Performance profiler. Shows I/O, communication, floating point operation usage and memory access costs. Supports multi-threaded and multi-process applications - such as those with MPI or OpenMP parallelism and scales to very high node counts.	Proprietary
CodeAnalyst by AMD	Linux, Windows	C, C++, Objective C .NET, Java (works at the executable level)	AMD uProf supersedes CodeAnalyst and CodeXL for CPU and Power profiling on AMD processors. GUI-based code profiler; does only basic timer-based profiling on Intel processors. Based on OProfile.	Free/open source (GPL) or proprietary
AMD CodeXL by AMD	Linux, Windows	For GPU profiling and debugging: OpenCL.	A tool suite for GPU profiling, GPU debugger and a static kernel analyzer.	Free/open source (MIT)
AMD uProf by AMD	Linux, Windows	C, C++, .NET, Java, Fortran	Code profiler, does sampling based profiling on AMD processors.	Proprietary
DevPartner by Borland / Micro Focus		.NET, Java	Test suite that automatically detects and diagnoses software defects and performance problems.	Proprietary
DTrace by Sun Microsystems	Solaris, Linux, BSD, macOS		Comprehensive dynamic tracing framework for troubleshooting kernel and application problems on production systems in real time.	Free/open source (CDDL)
dynamoRIO by RIO	Linux, Windows		Dynamic binary instrumentation framework for the development of dynamic program analysis tools.	Free/open source - BSD
Dynatrace	Linux, Windows, iOS, Android, Azure, AWS, AIX, Solaris, HP/UX, zOS, zLinux	.NET, Java, PHP, HTML5, Ajax (for web sites), Objective-C/iOS, Java/Android, C/C++, CICS, Apache, Nginx, Cassandra, Hadoop, MongoDB, HBase	See Application Performance Management.	Proprietary
Extrae	Linux, Android	Primarily C/C++/Fortran, but can profile any application linking against supported parallel libraries (e.g. MPI4PY)	HPC performance analysis tool with viewer and supporting utilities. Primarily designed for parallel applications with support for MPI, OpenMP, CUDA, OpenCL, pthreads, and OmpSs. Additional features include user function tracing and hardware event capture via PAPI.	Free/open source - LGPL-2.1
FusionReactor	Linux, Windows, macOS, AWS, Azure, Google Cloud	Java, ColdFusion, Apache, MongoDB Works with any Language supported by the JVM	Performs Application Performance Management and Performance and Root Cause Analysis. Combines APM and Low Level Developer Style Tooling; also includes a debugger and Java, memory, thread, and CPU profilers.	Proprietary
GlowCode by Electric Software, Inc.	Windows	64-bit and 32-bit applications, C, C++, .NET, and DLLs generated by any language compiler.	Performance and memory profiler that identifies time-intensive functions and detects memory leaks and errors.	Proprietary
gprof	Linux/Unix	Any language supported by gcc	Several tools with combined sampling and call-graph profiling. A set of visualization tools, VCG tools, uses the Call Graph Drawing Interface (CGDI) to interface with gprof. Another visualization tool that interfaces with gprof is KProf.	Free/open source - BSD version is part of 4.2BSD and GNU version is part of GNU Binutils (by GNU Project)
HWPMC	FreeBSD 6.0+		System-level and process-level counting and sampling hardware performance monitoring framework supporting multiple architectures.	BSD
Instana	Linux, Windows, iOS, Android, Azure, AWS, AIX, Solaris, HP/UX, zOS, zLinux	.NET, .Net core, Java, PHP, Ruby, Python, Crystal, Scala, Kotlin, Clojure, Haskell, Node.js, Web Browser, Apache, Nginx, Cassandra, Hadoop, MongoDB, Elasticsearch, Kafka	See Application Performance Management.	Proprietary
Instruments with Xcode	macOS	C, C++, Objective-C/C++, Swift, Cocoa apps.	Instruments shows a time line displaying any event occurring in the application, such as CPU activity variation, memory allocation, and network and file activity, together with graphs and statistics. Group of events are monitored by selecting specific instruments from: File Activity, Memory Allocations, Time Profiler, GPU activity etc. For system wide impact of the executable: System Trace, System usage, Network Usage, Energy log etc. are useful.	Free. Proprietary. Bundled with Xcode, which is also free.
Intel Advisor	Linux and Windows. Viewer only on macOS.	C, C++, Data Parallel C++ and Fortran	A collection of design and analysis tools - vectorization (SIMD) optimization, thread prototyping, automated roofline analysis, offload modeling and flow graph analysis	Freeware and Proprietary. Available as part of Intel oneAPI Base Toolkit.
Linux Trace Toolkit (LTT)	Linux	Requires patched kernel	Collects data on processes blocking, context switches, and execution time. This helps identify performance problems over multiple processes or threads. Superseded by LTTng.	GPL
LTTng (Linux Trace Toolkit Next Generation)	Linux		System software package for correlated tracing of kernel, applications and libraries.	GPL/LGPL/MIT
OProfile	Linux	Profiles everything running on the Linux system, including hard-to-profile programs such as interrupt handlers and the kernel itself.	Sampling profiler for Linux that counts cache misses, stalls, memory fetches, etc.	Open Source GPLv2
Oracle Solaris Studio Performance Analyzer	Linux, Solaris	C, C++, Fortran, Java; MPI	Performance and memory profiler.	Proprietary freeware
perf tools	Linux kernel 2.6.31+		Sampling profiler with support of hardware events on several architectures.	GPL
Performance Application Programming Interface (PAPI)	Various		Library for hardware performance counters on modern microprocessors.	
Pin by Intel	Linux, Windows, macOS, Android		Dynamic binary instrumentation system that allows users to create custom program analysis tools.	Proprietary but free for non-commercial use
Rational PurifyPlus	AIX, Linux, Solaris, Windows		Performance profiling tool, memory debugger and code coverage tool.	Proprietary
Scalasca	Linux	C/C++, Fortran	Parallel trace analyser.	Free/open source (BSD license)
Shark by Apple	macOS (discontinued with 10.7)		Performance analyzer.	Proprietary freeware
Superluminal	Windows, Xbox One, PlayStation	C++, Rust, .NET	Performance profiler (sampled or instrumented) and analyzer, focused on game development.	Proprietary
Systemtap	Linux		Programmable system tracing/probing tool; may be scripted to generate time- or performance-counter- or function-based profiles of the kernel and/or its userspace.	Open source
Valgrind	Linux, FreeBSD, Solaris/illumos, macOS, Android	Any, including assembler	System for debugging and profiling; supports tools to either detect memory management and threading bugs, or profile performance (cachegrind and callgrind). KCacheGrind, valkyrie and alleyoop are front-ends for valgrind.	Free/open source (GPL)
VTune Profiler by Intel Corporation (formerly VTune Amplifier)	Linux, Windows, viewer only for macOS	C, C++, C#, Data Parallel C++ (DPC++), Fortran, .NET, Java, Python, Go, ASM Assembly	A collection of profiling analyses implemented with sampling, instrumentation and processor trace technologies. Includes Hotspot, Threading, HPC, I/O, FPGA, GPU, System, Throttling and Microarchitecture analyses.	Freeware and Proprietary. Also available as a part of Intel oneAPI base toolkit.
Windows Performance Analysis Toolkit by Microsoft	Windows, Linux, Android		System-wide primary Windows performance analysis tool including CPU Sampling, CPU Scheduling, Disk and everything. Can open Linux LTTng and Perf Cpu Sampling traces; as well as Android Perfetto traces via plugins	Proprietary freeware with Linux / Android Open Source plugins
RotateRight Zoom	Linux, macOS, Viewer Only for Windows	Supports most compiled languages on ARM and x86 processors.	Graphical and command-line statistical (event-based) profiler.	
VisualSim	Linux, macOS, Microsoft Windows	Supports C/C++/SystemC	Graphical modeling and Simulation platform to select, analyze and validate architecture of complex electronics systems for performance, power and reliability.	Proprietary

== C and C++ ==
- Arm MAP, a performance profiler supporting Linux platforms.
- AppDynamics, an application performance management service for C/C++ applications via SDK.
- AQtime Pro, a performance profiler and memory allocation debugger that can be integrated into Microsoft Visual Studio, and Embarcadero RAD Studio, or can run as a stand-alone application.
- IBM Rational Purify was a memory debugger allowing performance analysis.
- Instruments (bundled with Xcode) is used to profile an executable's memory allocations, time usage, filesystem activity, GPU activity etc.
- Intel Parallel Studio contains Intel VTune Amplifier, which tunes both serial and parallel programs. It also includes Intel Advisor and Intel Inspector. Intel Advisor optimizes vectorization (use of SIMD instructions) and prototypes threading implementations. Intel Inspector detects and debugs races, deadlocks and memory errors.
- Parasoft Insure++ provides a graphical tool that displays and animates memory allocations in real time to expose memory blowout, fragmentation, overuse, bottlenecks and leaks.
- Visual Studio Team System Profiler, commercial profiler by Microsoft.

== Java ==
- inspectIT is an open-source application performance management (APM) service for monitoring and analyzing software applications, available under the Apache License, Version 2.0 (ALv2).
- JConsole is the profiler which comes with the Java Development Kit
- JProfiler
- JRockit Mission Control, a profiler with low overhead.
- Netbeans Profiler, a profiler integrated into the NetBeans IDE (internally uses jvisualvm profiler)
- Plumbr, Java application performance monitoring with automated root cause detection. Links memory leaks, GC inefficiency, slow database and external web service calls, locked threads, and other performance problems to the line in source code that causes them.
- OverOps, Continuous reliability for the modern software supply chain, automatically detect and deliver root cause automation for all errors.
- VisualVM is a visual tool integrating several commandline JDK tools and lightweight profiling capabilities. It is bundled with the Java Development Kit since version 6, update 7.

== JavaScript ==
- The Firefox web browser's developer tools contain a Performance tool, which gives insight into JavaScript performance of a website.
- Microsoft Visual Studio AJAX Profiling Extensions is a free profiling tool for JavaScript by Microsoft Research.

== .NET ==
- CLR Profiler is a free memory profiler provided by Microsoft for CLR applications.
- GlowCode is a performance and memory profiler for .NET applications using C# and other .NET languages. It identifies time-intensive functions and detects memory leaks and errors in native, managed and mixed Windows x86-64 and x86 applications.
- Visual Studio

== PHP ==
- BlackFire.io
- Dbg
- Xdebug is a PHP extension which provides debugging and profiling capabilities.

== See also ==
- Performance analysis
- Memory debugger (includes list of memory profilers)
