= RAPL =

RAPL may refer to:

- L-lysine cyclodeaminase, an enzyme
- Running average power limit, an Intel processor feature
- Right Adjoints Preserve Limits, a theorem regarding adjoint functors in category theory.
