= CLR Profiler =

Software utility

- Original author: Microsoft
- Stable release: 4.5 / November 2012; 13 years ago
- Repository: github.com/microsoftarchive/clrprofiler/
- Written in: C#, C++
- Operating system: Microsoft Windows
- Platform: .NET Framework,.NET Compact Framework
- Type: Memory profiler
- License: MIT License
- Website: www.microsoft.com/downloads/details.aspx?familyid=CD5AA57C-9CD1-45AB-AA4B-8DC586D30938&displaylang=en

CLR Profiler is a free and open-source memory profiler for the .NET Framework from Microsoft. It allows the user to investigate the contents of the managed heap, the behavior of the garbage collector, and the allocation patterns (including call-graph analysis) of the program being profiled.

== Overview ==
The latest version, 4.5, released in November 2012, allows for profiling of .NET 2.0, 3.0, 3.5, 4.0 or 4.5 managed code as well as Silverlight apps. The source code was originally included under the Microsoft Limited Reciprocal License (MS-LRL) and hosted on CodePlex. It is now available on GitHub under the MIT License.

CLR Profiler is an intrusive tool; seeing a 10 to 100x slowdown in the application being profiled is not unusual. Therefore, it is not the right tool to find out where time is spent – use other profilers to profile the CPU usage of an application.

== Releases ==
- CLR Profiler for .NET 4.5 (Supported .NET Framework versions: 4.5, 4.0, 3.5, 3.0, 2.0.)
- CLR Profiler for .NET 4.0
- Power Toys for .NET Compact Framework 3.5 (includes a NETCF CLR Profiler)
- CLR Profiler for .NET 2.0
- CLR Profiler for .NET 1.1

== See also ==
- List of performance analysis tools
- AQtime
- OProfile
