= Black Fire =

Black Fire may refer to:

== Film ==
- Black Fire (film) (Fuoco nero), 1951 Italian film
- Black fire (also titled Blackfire), 1972 Australian short film by Bruce McGuinness

== Literature ==
- Black Fire: An Anthology of Afro-American Writing, co-edited in 1968 by Amiri Baraka and Larry Neal
- Black Fire (novel), a Star Trek novel

== Other uses ==
- Black Fire (2022), the third-largest wildfire in New Mexico
- Black Fire (album), a 1964 album by Andrew Hill
- Black Fire (video game), a 1995 3D helicopter combat game
- "Black Fire" a song by DragonForce from the 2003 album Valley of the Damned

== See also ==
- Blackfire (disambiguation)
- Green Fire
- Silver fire (disambiguation)
- White Fire (disambiguation)
