= WPA =

WPA may refer to:

== Computing ==
- Wi-Fi Protected Access, a wireless encryption standard
- Windows Product Activation, in Microsoft software licensing
- Wireless Public Alerting (Alert Ready), emergency alerts over LTE in Canada
- Windows Performance Analyzer

== Organizations ==
- World Pool Association
- World Psychiatric Association

=== United States ===
- Works Progress Administration or Work Projects Administration, a former American New Deal agency
- Washington Project for the Arts
- Western Psychological Association
- Women's Prison Association

== Legislation ==
=== United States ===
- Whistleblower Protection Act, a law protecting certain whistleblowers in the USA
- War Powers Resolution or War Powers Act, a limitation of presidential powers
- War Powers Act of 1941, the authorization for United States entry into World War 2

== Other ==
- WPA, a 2009 album by Works Progress Administration (band)
- Win probability added, a baseball statistic
- Water pinch analysis
- Woomera Prohibited Area, a tract of land in South Australia covering more than 120,000 sq km of arid 'outback'
- Waterfowl production area, land protected through easements or purchase to conserve habitat for waterfowl in the United States
- An abbreviation for Western Pennsylvania
- Women's Political Association of Victoria an early 20th century organisation in Australia
