= Blackfire =

Blackfire may refer to:

== Comics and literature ==
- Blackfire, an erotic magazine published by the BLK organization
- Blackfire (DC Comics), a comic book supervillainess
- Deacon Blackfire, a DC comic book supervillain

== Music ==
- Blackfire (American band), a punk rock group
- Blackfire (Australian band), an Indigenous Australian rock band

== Other uses ==
- Black fire, alternatively titled Blackfire, 1972 Australian short film by Bruce McGuinness
- Blackfire Exploration, a Canadian mining corporation
- Blackfire Profiler, a software performance analysis tool

== See also ==
- Black Fire (disambiguation)
