= Instruments (software) =

Application for debugging and analyzing software

- Instruments as it appears in Xcode 26
- Developer: Apple Inc
- Stable release: 26.0 / September 15, 2025
- Operating system: macOS
- Type: Tracing & Profiling
- License: Proprietary freeware
- Website: help.apple.com/instruments

Instruments (formerly Xray) is an application performance analyzer and visualizer by Apple Inc., integrated in Xcode 3.0 and later versions of Xcode. It is built on top of the DTrace tracing framework from OpenSolaris, which was ported to Mac OS X v10.5 and which is available in all following versions of macOS.

Instruments shows a time line displaying any event occurring in the application, such as CPU activity variation, memory allocation, and network and file activity, together with graphs and statistics. Group of events are monitored via customizable "instruments", which have the ability to record user generated events and replay (emulate) them exactly as many times as needed, so a developer can see the effect of code changes without actually doing the repetitive work. The Instrument Builder feature allows the creation of custom analysis instruments.

== Features ==
Built-in instruments can track:

- CPU activity of processes and threads
- Memory allocation and release, garbage collection and memory leaks
- File reads, writes, locks
- Network activity and traffic This instrument works like Activity Monitor but also stores the data for future reference.
- Graphics and inner workings of OpenGL and Metal.
- Energy diagnostics and "dead" objects
- UI automation and Core animation
- User events, such as keyboard keys pressed and mouse moves and clicks with exact time

== See also ==
- List of performance analysis tools
- Dashcode
- Shark (application)
