= Scalasca =

Performance profiling software

- Developers: Forschungszentrum Jülich and Technische Universität Darmstadt
- Written in: C, C++
- Operating system: Unix-like
- Platform: IA-32, x64, ARM, PowerPC
- Type: Profiling
- License: BSD
- Website: www.scalasca.org

Scalasca is a free and open-source software for measurement, analysis, and optimization of parallel program performance. It is licensed under the BSD-style license.

Scalasca is mostly used for profiling scientific and engineering applications using OpenMP and/or MPI. It supports runtime analysis on supercomputers. The application being analysed needs first of all to be "instrumented": MPI usage is instrumented simply by linking the application to the measuring library, while OpenMP usage is instrumented by recompiling from source using Scalasca's modified compiler.
