= Performance Analyzer =

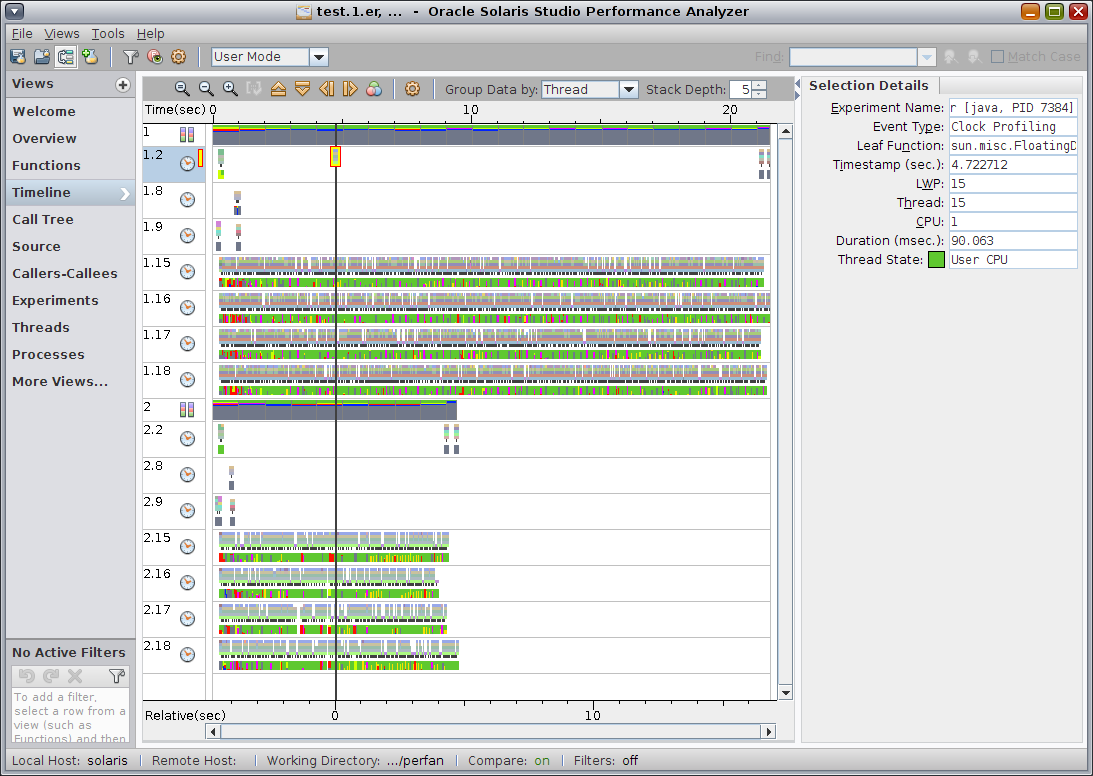
- Developer: Oracle
- Stable release: 12.5 / June 2016; 9 years ago
- Operating system: Solaris and Linux
- Type: Profiler
- License: Commercial proprietary software
- Website: www.oracle.com/application-development/technologies/developerstudio-features.html#performance-analyzer-tab

Performance Analyzer is a commercial utility software for software performance analysis for x86 or SPARC machines. It has both a graphical user interface and a command line interface. It is available for both Linux and Solaris operating systems. It can profile C, C++, and Java.

Performance Analyzer is available as part of Oracle Developer Studio. It has visualization capabilities, can read out hardware performance counters, thread synchronization, memory allocations and I/O, and specifically supports Java, OpenMP, MPI, and the Solaris kernel.

== See also ==
- List of performance analysis tools
- Performance analysis
- VTune
