= CodeXL =

Open-source software development tool suite

- Original author(s): Advanced Micro Devices
- Stable release: 2.6 / October 15, 2018; 6 years ago
- Repository: github.com/GPUOpen-Archive/CodeXL
- Written in: C, C++
- Operating system: Linux, Windows
- Type: GPU debugging, GPU & CPU profiling, Static Kernel Analysis
- License: MIT License
- Website: gpuopen.com/archived/legacy-codexl/

CodeXL (formerly AMD CodeXL) was an open-source software development tool suite which included a GPU debugger, a GPU profiler, a CPU profiler, a graphics frame analyzer and a static shader/kernel analyzer.

CodeXL was mainly developed by AMD. With version 2.0 CodeXL was made part of GPUOpen and is free and open-source software subject to the requirements of the MIT License. It is no longer branded as an AMD product.

CPU profiler and Power profiler were included in CodeXL until version 2.5. Now these profilers are released as part of the AMD uProf tool.

In April 2020 AMD updated the GitHub repository announcing that "CodeXL is no longer being actively developed or supported by AMD and is being archived"

== Features ==
=== GPU debugger ===
CodeXL's GPU debugger allows engineers to debug OpenGL and OpenCL API calls and runtime objects, and debug OpenCL kernels: set breakpoints, step through source code in real-time, view all variables across different GPU cores during kernel execution, identify logic and memory errors, reduce memory transaction overhead, visualize OpenCL/OpenGL buffers and images and OpenGL textures as pictures or as spreadsheet data, and in this way to improve general software quality and optimize its performance.

=== GPU profiler ===
CodeXL's GPU profiler collects and visualizes hardware performance counters data, application trace, kernel occupancy, and offers hotspot analysis for AMD GPUs and APUs. The profiler gathers data from the OpenCL runtime, and from the GPU/APU itself during the execution of the kernels, and can be used to discover performance bottlenecks and optimize kernel execution.

=== CPU profiler ===
AMD uProf supersedes the CodeXL for CPU and Power Profiling functionalities on AMD processors.

CodeXL's CPU profiling suite can be used to identify, investigate and improve the performance of applications, drivers and system software on AMD CPUs. CodeXL's CPU profiler uses a statistical sampling based approach with various profiling techniques and measures: Time-Based Profiling (TBP), Event-Based Profiling (EBP), Instruction-Based Sampling (IBS) and CPU hardware performance monitors. The CodeXL CPU profiler replaces AMD CodeAnalyst.

=== Static Shader/Kernel Analyzer ===
CodeXL's static kernel analyzer allows engineers to compile, analyze and disassemble the code of DirectX, OpenGL and Vulkan shaders and OpenCL kernels. The tool provides performance estimation for each shader/kernel on different kinds of AMD chips, without actually executing the code. This way, the tool assists in fine-tuning to achieve best performance on AMD GPUs.

==== Radeon GPU Analyzer (RGA) ====
In Q1 2017, AMD CodeXL Analyzer was replaced by Radeon GPU Analyzer (RGA), maintaining backward compatibility. Radeon GPU Analyzer CLI is an offline compiler and a performance analysis tool for DirectX shaders, OpenGL shaders, Vulkan shaders and OpenCL kernels.

=== HSA profiler ===
With version 2.0 the CodeXL HSA Profiler and HSAIL Kernel Debugger support the Boltzmann initiative driver, on GCN 1.2 hardware (i.e. Radeon R9 Fury, Fury X and Fury Nano, and "Carrizo" APUs.

=== Graphics Frame Analyzer ===
The Frame Analyzer can collect and display a frame timeline for applications that use Microsoft DirectX 12 or Vulkan. The analyzer's view lists each API call that was made on the CPU side and its corresponding command that executed on the GPU side in an inter-linked and unified timeline view, as well as aggregated statistics for user-selected specific time fragment – cumulative time for each type of API, number of calls, 20 longest calls and more.

== Supported platforms ==
CodeXL officially supports both Linux and Microsoft Windows operating systems. On Windows, CodeXL is available both as a standalone application and as a fully integrated Microsoft Visual Studio extension.

CodeXL was successfully used to debug Bullet.

== Versions and availability ==
- AMD CodeXL 1.0, released on December 4, 2012.
- AMD CodeXL 1.1, released on February 27, 2013.
- AMD CodeXL 1.2, released on July 9, 2013.
- AMD CodeXL 1.3, released on November 11, 2013.
- AMD CodeXL 1.4, released on April 11, 2014.
- AMD CodeXL 1.5, released on September 22, 2014.
- AMD CodeXL 1.6, released on December 16, 2014.
- AMD CodeXL 1.7, released on April 28. 2015.
- AMD CodeXL 1.8, released on August 20. 2015.
- CodeXL 2.0, released on April 19, 2016.
- CodeXL 2.1, released on May 31, 2016.
- CodeXL 2.2, released on August 8, 2016.
- CodeXL 2.4, released on June 20, 2017.
- CodeXL 2.5, released on September 26, 2017.
- CodeXL 2.6, released on October 15, 2018.

The latest version of CodeXL is freely available for download on the CodeXL GitHub releases page.

== GPU PerfStudio ==
GPU PerfStudio is AMD's performance and debugging tool for graphics applications. It was initially developed to support Direct3D and OpenGL on Microsoft Windows only and was ported to Linux during 2013 and is available for Linux since the end of Q1 2014. The suite of tools is considered useful when developing games for Steam Linux and especially useful when optimizing games for AMD GPUs. GPU PerfStudio has an integrated Frame Profiles, Frame Debugger and API Trace with CPU timing information.

GPU PerfStudio supports Direct3D 10, Direct3D 10.1, Direct3D 11 and OpenGL 4.2. It is described as a lightweight, no installer, no change to your game, drag and drop suite of GPU tools. It can be run from a USB drive, there is no need for Visual Studio integration, it runs with game executables, it does not require a special driver or a new compilation.

GPU PerfStudio 3.6 supports Direct3D 12 on Windows 10 and Vulkan on Windows and Linux.

GPU PerfStudio is available for Linux and Microsoft Windows.

At the AMD Developer Summit (APU) in November 2013 Gordon Selley presented GPU PerfStudio 2.

At the SteamDevDays in February 2014, Tony Hosier and Gordon Selley presented GPU PerfStudio 2 in a 43 minutes video.

=== Frame Debugger ===
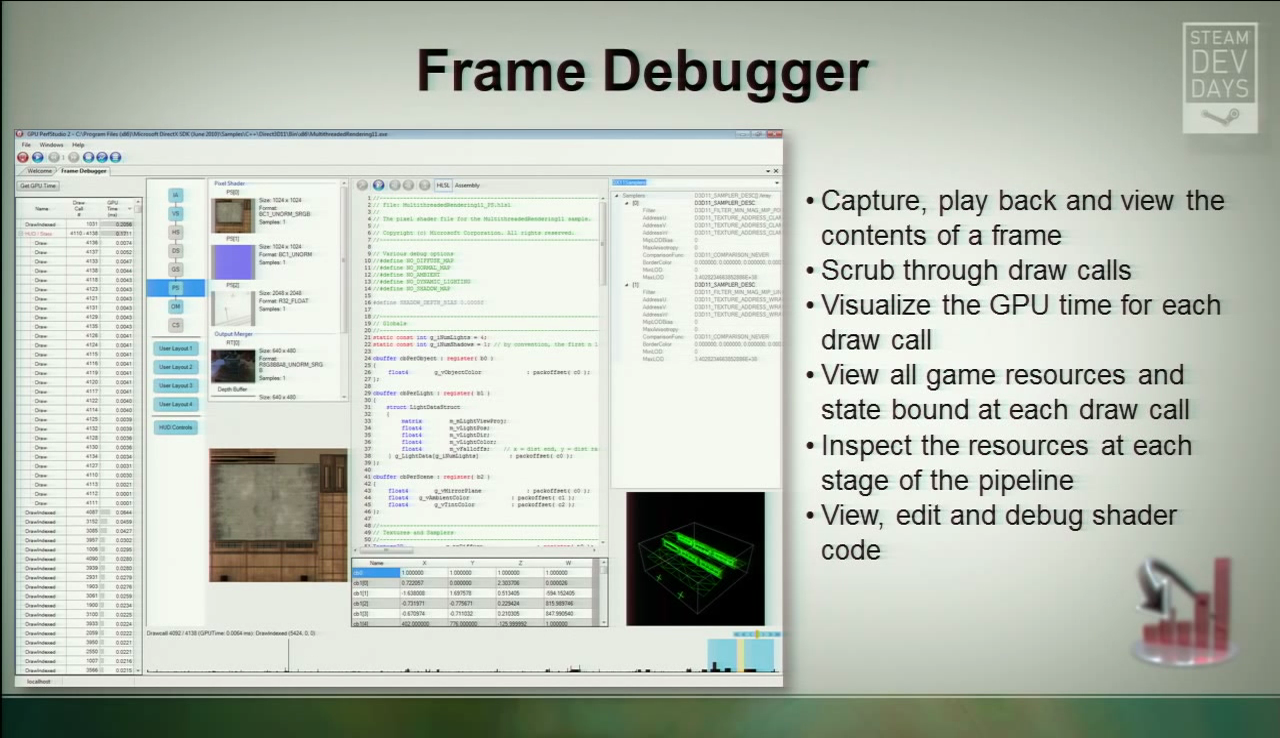
GPU PerfStudio2 Frame Debugger

=== Frame Profiles ===
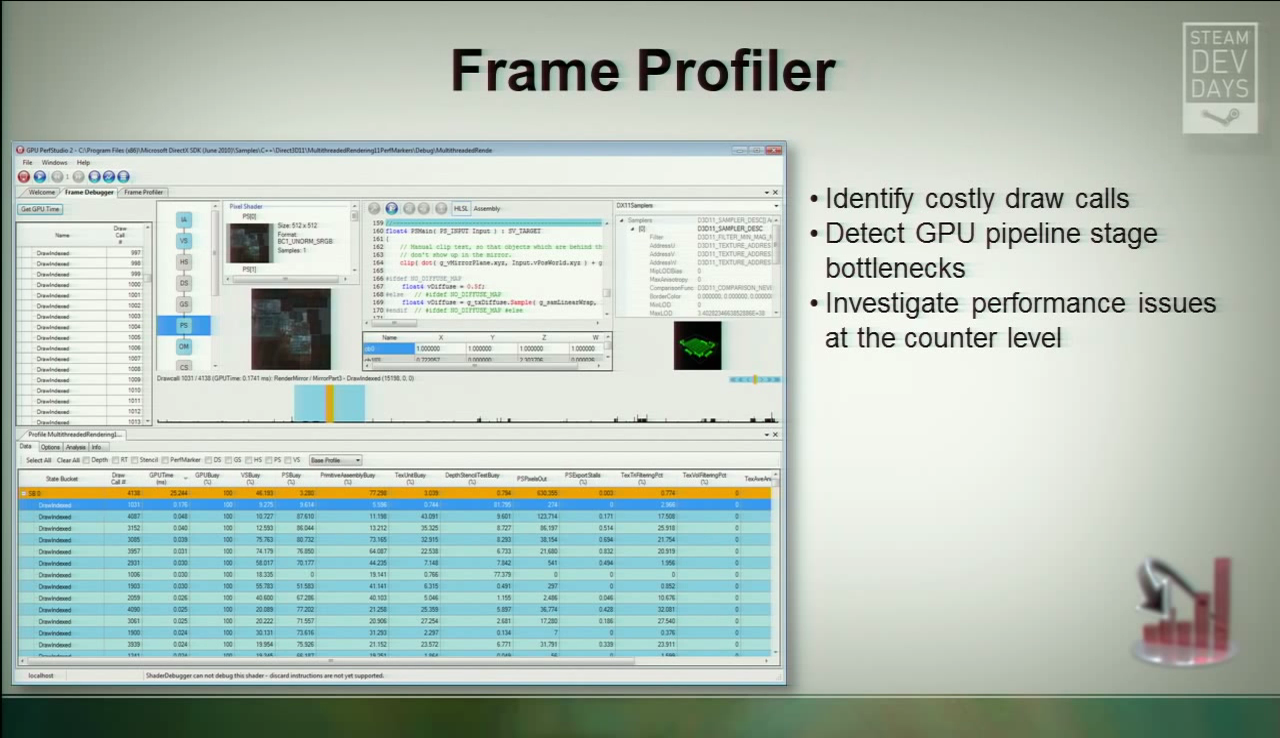
GPU PerfStudio2 Frame Profiler

=== Shader Debugger ===
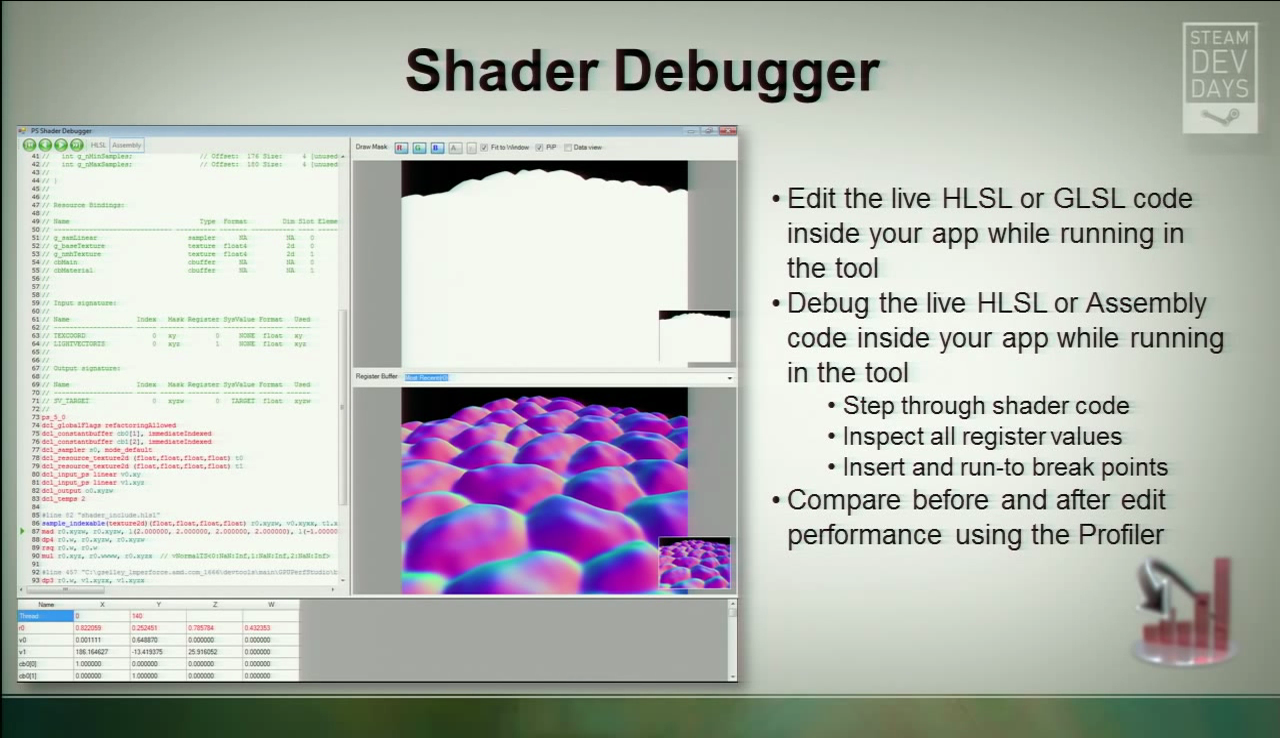
GPU PerfStudio2 Shader Debugger

=== API Trace ===
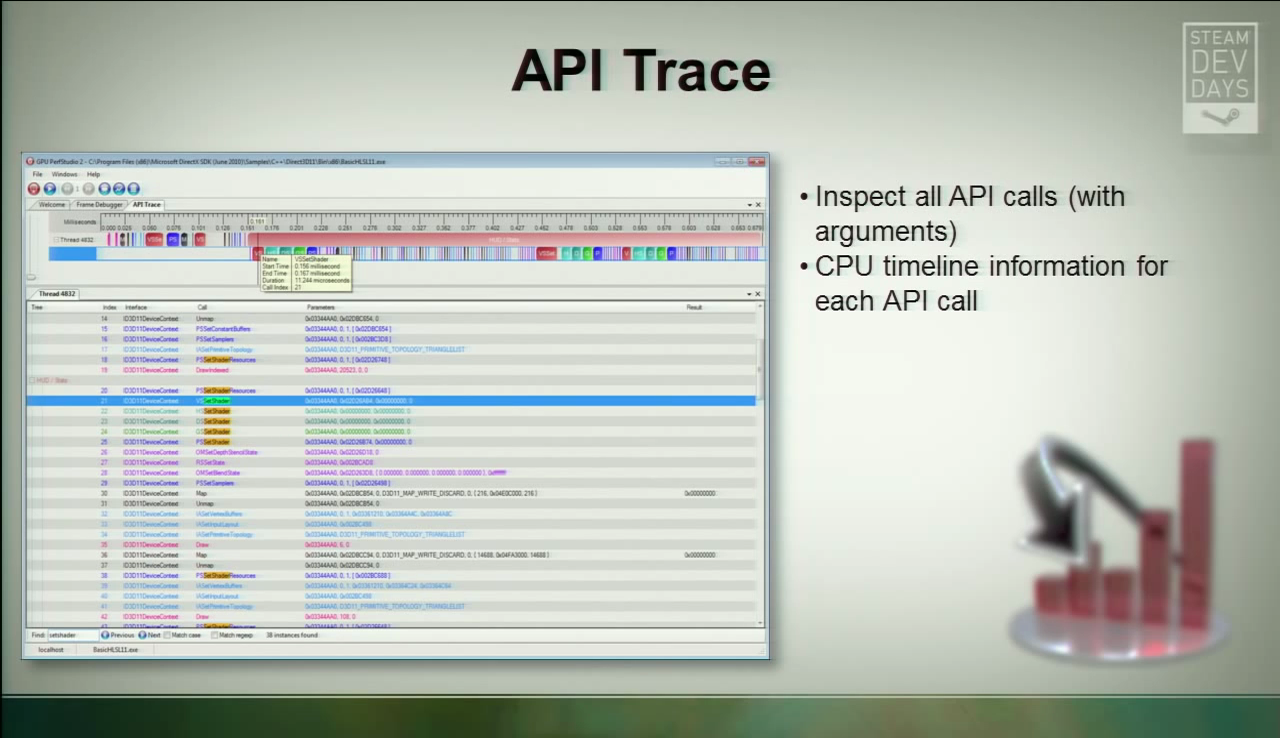
GPU PerfStudio2 API Trace API call

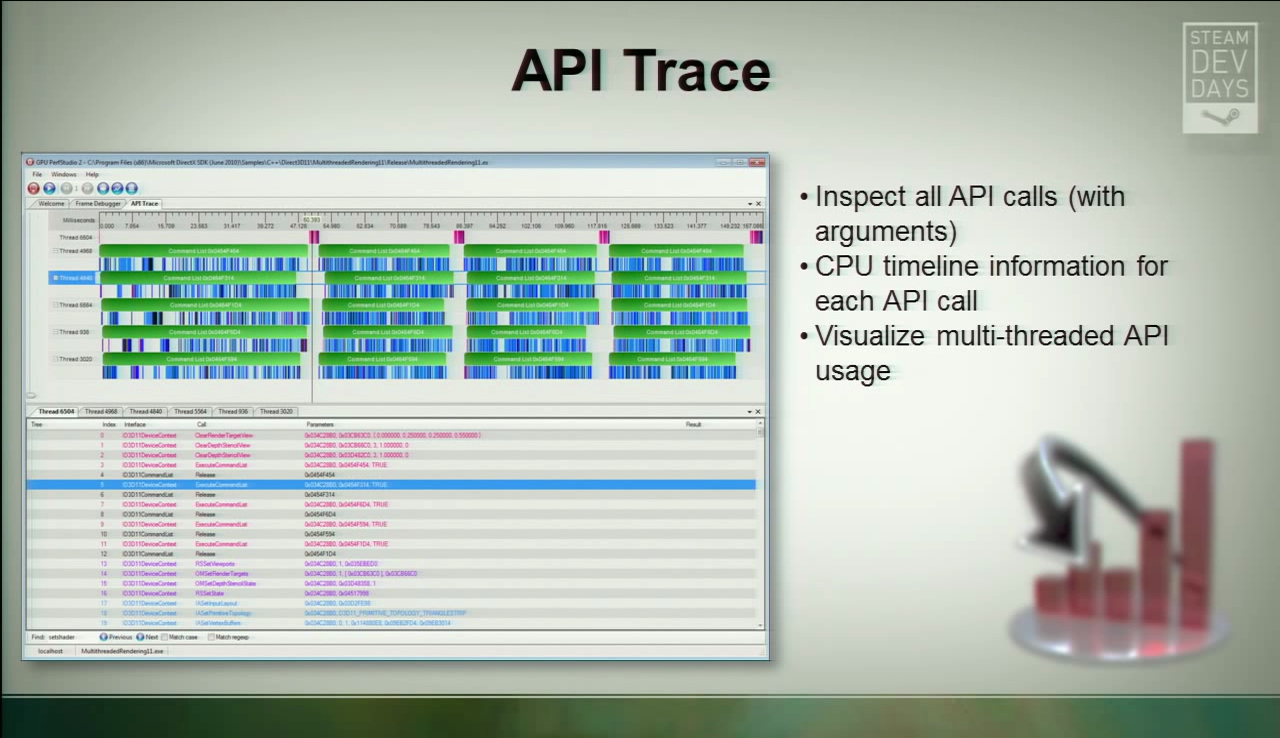
GPU PerfStudio2 API Trace multi-threaded API usage

=== GPUPerfAPI ===
GPUPerfAPI is AMD's library for accessing GPU performance counters on AMD Radeon graphics cards and APUs. It is used by GPU PerfStudio and CodeXL and is also available to third-party developers who wish to incorporate it within their own applications. GPUPerfAPI supports DirectX11, OpenGL, and OpenCL applications. GPUPerfAPI is available for Linux and Microsoft Windows.

== See also ==
- List of performance analysis tools
- AMD CodeAnalyst
- Heterogeneous System Architecture (HSA)
