= L-lysine cyclodeaminase =

Class of enzymes

Identifiers
- EC no.: 4.3.1.28

Databases
- BRENDA: enzyme data
- ExPASy: NiceZyme view
- KEGG: enzyme entry
- MetaCyc: metabolic pathway
- Rhea: reactions
- PDB structures: RCSB PDB PDBe PDBsum
Search
- PMC: articles
- PubMed: articles
- NCBI: proteins

L-lysine cyclodeaminase (EC 4.3.1.28, rapL (gene), fkbL (gene), tubZ (gene), visC (gene)) is an enzyme with systematic name L-lysine ammonia-lyase (cyclizing; ammonia-forming). This enzyme catalyses the following chemical reaction

L-lysine $\rightleftharpoons$ L-pipecolate + NH_{3}

This enzyme requires bound NAD^{+}.
