= White Fire =

White Fire may refer to:

- White Fire (film), a 1984 French-American-Italian-Turkish thriller film
- White Fire (novel), a 2013 novel by Douglas Preston and Lincoln Child
- Three Steps to the Gallows, a 1953 British crime film, released in the US as White Fire
