= Blackfire Profiler =

Software performance analysis tool

Blackfire
- Developer: SensioLabs
- Stable release: 1.4.0
- Written in: Go, PHP and JavaScript
- Operating system: Linux Mac OS X FreeBSD and Microsoft_Windows
- Type: Performance analysis
- License: commercial
- Website: blackfire.io

Blackfire Profiler is a tool that instruments PHP applications to gather data about consumed server resources like memory, CPU time, and I/O operations. Blackfire is also a SaaS service to visualize any callgrind-compatible profile.

Its architecture is based on a Probe, which is a PHP extension that gathers the raw performance profiles and an Agent, which is a server-side daemon that aggregates and forwards profiles to blackfire.io servers to visualize them.

Blackfire has been used by some popular PHP projects such as ownCloud, Drupal, Symfony and Laravel to improve their performance and to spot performance bottlenecks.

As of March 2015 Blackfire is actively developed.

== Features ==
- Profile web pages, command line scripts and APIs and web services.
- Compatible with the profiles generated with XHProf, Xdebug and Google Chrome CPU Profiler.
- Compare two profiles to spot the parts of the application which have been improved or degraded.
- Automatic aggregation of negligible internal PHP functions.
- Detection of PHP Garbage Collector cycles.
- Application performance management (APM).
