= AQtime =

- Original author(s): AutomatedQA
- Developer(s): SmartBear Software
- Initial release: 1999
- Stable release: 8.20 / February 25, 2014; 11 years ago
- Available in: English
- License: Proprietary
- Website: smartbear.com/products/development-tools/performance-profiling/

AQtime is a performance profiler and memory/resource debugging toolset developed by SmartBear Software. It is integrated into Microsoft Visual Studio, Visual Studio Test Projects, and Embarcadero RAD Studio, which allows analyzing the application without leaving the development environment.

== Overview ==
AQtime is used for multiple optimization tasks to improve application performance and memory usage. It includes a set of profilers for the analysis of different application aspects. It does sophisticated application performance analysis of function execution time down to the individual source code lines. It tracks performance issues and memory leaks. It analyzes resource usage and function call order. It monitors code coverage, Windows API compliance and includes other profilers for analyzing more application properties.

=== Features ===
- Support for Windows and .NET compilers.
- Support for profiling 32- and 64-bit applications.
- Profiling Java and Silverlight Applications.
- Profiling scripts.
- Integration into Microsoft Visual Studio and Embarcadero RAD Studio IDEs.

=== Awards ===
- Software Development Jolt Awards presented by Software Development magazine: 2006
- Delphi Informant Readers Choice Awards as the Best in the Debugging Tool category: 2004, 2003
- asp.netPRO Readers' Choice Awards: 2005
- The Best in the .NET Profiler category .NET Developer's Journal's Readers' Choice Awards: 2004

== See also ==
- Software optimization
- Performance analysis
- List of performance analysis tools
- Debugger
- Memory debugger
