= Oracle Developer Studio =

Integrated development environment

- Developer: Oracle Corporation/Sun Microsystems
- Stable release: 12.6 / July 5, 2017; 9 years ago
- Operating system: Solaris, OpenSolaris, RHEL, Oracle Linux
- Available in: English, Japanese; Simplified Chinese
- Type: Compiler, debugger, software build, integrated development environment
- License: Free for download and use as described in the product license
- Website: www.oracle.com/technetwork/server-storage/developerstudio/overview

Oracle Developer Studio, formerly named Oracle Solaris Studio, Sun Studio, Sun WorkShop, Forte Developer, and SunPro Compilers, is the Oracle Corporation's flagship software development product for the Solaris and Linux operating systems. It includes optimizing C, C++, and Fortran compilers, libraries, and performance analysis and debugging tools, for Solaris on SPARC and x86 platforms, and Linux on x86/x64 platforms, including multi-core systems.

Oracle Developer Studio is downloadable and usable at no charge; however, there are many security and functionality patch updates which are only available with a support contract from Oracle.

Version 12.4 added partial support for the C++11 language standard. All C++11 features are supported except for concurrency and atomic operations, and user-defined literals. Version 12.6 supports the C++14 language standard.

== Languages ==
- C
- C++
- Fortran

== Supported architectures ==
- SPARC
- i86pc (x86 and x86-64)

== Components ==
The Oracle Developer software suite includes:

- C, C++, and Fortran compilers and support libraries
- dbx and frontends
- lint
- A NetBeans-based IDE
- Performance Analyzer
- Thread analyzer
- Sun performance library
- Distributed make

== Compiler optimizations ==
A common optimizing backend is used for code generation.

A high-level intermediate representation called Sun IR is used, and high-level optimizations done in the iropt (intermediate representation optimizer) component are operated at the Sun IR level. Major optimizations include:

- Copy propagation
- Constant folding and constant propagation
- Dead code elimination
- Interprocedural optimization analysis
- Loop optimizations
- Automatic parallelization
- Profile-guided optimization
- Scalar replacement
- Strength reduction
- Automatic vectorization, with -xvector=simd

== OpenMP ==
The OpenMP shared memory parallelization API is native to all three compilers.

== Code coverage ==
Tcov, a source code coverage analysis and statement-by-statement profiling tool, comes as a standard utility. Tcov generates exact counts of the number of times each statement in a program is executed and annotates source code to add instrumentation.

The tcov utility gives information on how often a program executes segments of code. It produces a copy of the source file, annotated with execution frequencies. The code can be annotated at the basic block level or the source line level. As the statements in a basic block are executed the same number of times, a count of basic block executions equals the number of times each statement in the block is executed. The tcov utility does not produce any time-based data.

== GCCFSS ==
The GCC for SPARC Systems (GCCFSS) compiler uses GNU Compiler Collection's (GCC) front end with the Oracle Developer Studio compiler's code-generating back end. Thus, GCCFSS is able to handle GCC-specific compiler directives, while it is also able to take advantage of the compiler optimizations in the compiler's back end. This greatly facilitates the porting of GCC-based applications to SPARC systems.

GCCFSS 4.2 adds the ability to be used as a cross compiler; SPARC binaries can be generated on an x86 (or x64) machine running Solaris.

== Research platform ==
Before its cancellation, the Rock would have been the first general-purpose processor to support hardware transactional memory (HTM). The Oracle Developer Studio compiler is used by a number of research projects, including Hybrid Transactional Memory (HyTM) and Phased Transactional Memory (PhTM), to investigate support and possible HTM optimizations.

== History ==
Product name	C/C++ compiler	Supported Operating Systems	Release date
SPARCworks 1.0	1.0	SunOS 4	1991
SPARCworks 2.0 (SPARCompiler)	2.0	Solaris 2.x, SunOS 4.1.x	June 1992
SunSoft Workshop 1.0	3.0	Solaris 2.x, SunOS 4.1.x	July 1994
SunSoft Workshop 2.0	4.0	Solaris 2.2 or later	March 1995
Sun Workshop 3.0 / 4.0	4.2	Solaris 2.4, 2.5, 2.6, 7	January 1997
Sun Workshop 5.0	5.0	Solaris 2.5.1, 2.6, 7	December 1998
Forte Developer 6 (Sun WorkShop 6)	5.1	Solaris 2.6, 7, 8	May 2000
Forte Developer 6 update 1	5.2	Solaris 2.6, 7, 8	November 2000
Forte Developer 6 update 2	5.3	Solaris 2.6, 7, 8, 9	July 2001
Sun ONE Studio 7 (Forte Developer 7)	5.4	Solaris 7, 8, 9	May 2002
Sun ONE Studio 8 Compiler Collection	5.5	Solaris 7, 8, 9, 10	May 2003
Sun Studio 8	5.5	Solaris 7, 8, 9, 10	March 2004
Sun Studio 9	5.6	Solaris 8, 9, 10; Linux	July 2004
Sun Studio 10	5.7	Solaris 8, 9, 10; Linux	January 2005
Sun Studio 11	5.8	Solaris 8, 9, 10; Linux	November 2005
Sun Studio 12	5.9	Solaris 9, 10 1/06; Linux	June 2007
Sun Studio 12 Update 1	5.10	Solaris 10 1/06; OpenSolaris 2008.11, 2009.06; Linux	June 2009
Oracle Solaris Studio 12.2	5.11	Solaris 10 1/06 and above; Linux	September 2010
Oracle Solaris Studio 12.3	5.12	Solaris 10 10/08 and above, 11; Linux	December 2011
Oracle Solaris Studio 12.4	5.13	Solaris 10 8/11, 10 1/13, 11.2; Linux	November 2014
Oracle Developer Studio 12.5	5.14	Solaris 10 1/13, 11.3; Linux	June 2016
Oracle Developer Studio 12.6	5.15	Solaris 10 1/13, 11.3; Linux	June 2017

– Source:
