= Silver fire =

Silver fire may refer to:

- Silver Fire (1987 Oregon wildfire), in the Siskiyou National Forest
- Silver Fire, an August 2013 wildfire in southern California near Banning and Cabazon
- Silver Fire, a 2013 forest fire in southwest New Mexico in the vicinity of Silver City
- Silver Fire (Forgotten Realms), an ability in Dungeons & Dragons
- "Silver Fire", a science fiction story by Greg Egan
