= Performance Application Programming Interface =

Software library for microprocessor metrics

In computer science, Performance Application Programming Interface (PAPI) is a portable interface (in the form of a library) to hardware performance counters on modern microprocessors. It is being widely used to collect low level performance metrics (e.g. instruction counts, clock cycles, cache misses) of computer systems running UNIX/Linux operating systems.

PAPI provides predefined high level hardware events summarized from popular processors and direct access to low level native events of one particular processor. Counter multiplexing and overflow handling are also supported.

Operating system support for accessing hardware counters is needed to use PAPI.

For example, prior to 2010, a Linux/x86 kernel had to be patched with a performance monitoring counters driver (perfctr link) to support PAPI. Since Linux version 2.6.32, and PAPI 2010 releases, PAPI can leverage the existing perf subsystem in Linux, and thus does not need any out of tree driver to be functional anymore.

Supported Operating Systems and requirements are listed in the official repository's documentation INSTALL.txt.

== See also ==
- Performance analysis
