= Adam Kolawa =

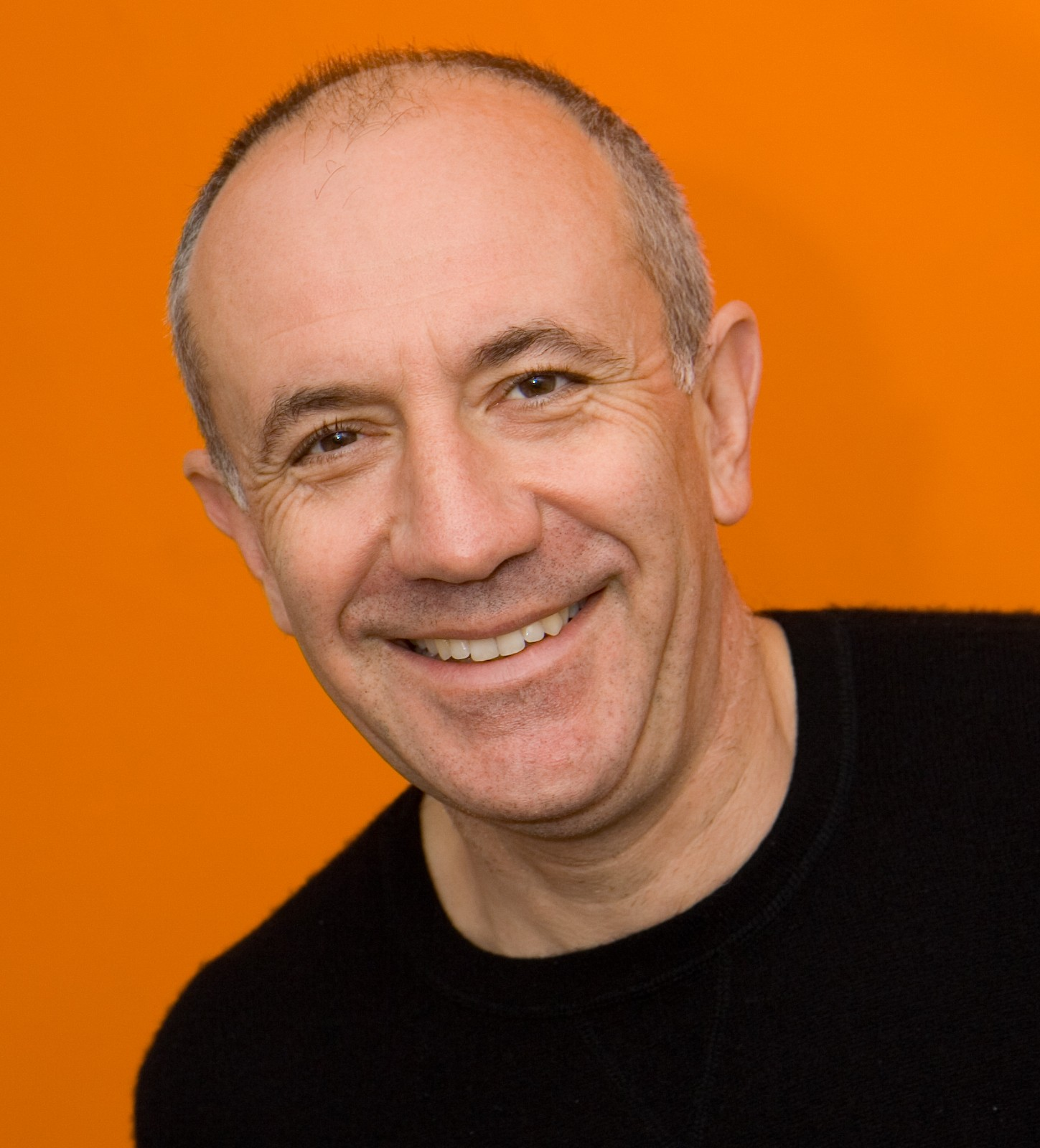
- Born: June 25, 1957; Poland
- Died: April 26, 2011 (aged 53); California
- Occupation: CEO/Co-Founder Parasoft
- Spouse: Elizabeth Kolawa
- Children: Natalie Kolawa, Adam Kolawa Jr.

Adam Kazimierz Kolawa (June 25, 1957 – April 26, 2011) was CEO and co-founder of Parasoft, a software company in Monrovia, California, that makes software development tools.

== History ==
Kolawa received a M.Sc. in Electrical Engineering from the AGH University of Science and Technology in 1981 and a M.Sc. in physics from Jagiellonian University in 1982. After Kolawa emigrated from Poland to the United States, he earned a Ph.D. in Theoretical Physics from the California Institute of Technology. While at Caltech, he worked with Geoffrey Fox and helped design and implement the Intel hypercube parallel computer known as the Cosmic Cube.

In 1987, he founded Parasoft with four friends from Caltech. Initially, the company focused on parallel processing technologies. Kolawa co-authored two books on development testing and software testing. In 2001, Kolawa was awarded the Los Angeles Ernst & Young's Entrepreneur of the Year Award in the Software category.

Kolawa was granted 20 patents for software technologies he has invented. His patents include runtime memory error detection technology (Patent US 5842019 and US 5581696 – granted in 1998), statically analyzing source code quality using rules (Patent US 5860011 – granted in 1999), and automated unit test case generation technology (Patent US 5761408 and US 5784553 – granted in 1998).

Kolawa died suddenly on April 26, 2011.

== Publications ==
=== Books ===
- Kolawa, Adam (2009). The Next Leap in Productivity: What Top Managers Really Need to Know about Information Technology. Wiley. p. 224. ISBN 978-0-470-39811-1.
- Kolawa, Adam; Huizinga, Dorota (2007). Automated Defect Prevention: Best Practices in Software Management. Wiley-IEEE Computer Society Press. p. 426. ISBN 978-0-470-04212-0. Archived from the original on 2012-04-25.
- Kolawa, Adam; Hicken, Wendell; Dunlop, Cynthia (2001). Bulletproofing Web Applications. Wiley. p. 545. ISBN 0-7645-4866-2.
- Oram, Andy; Wilson, Greg, eds. (2007). Beautiful Code: Leading Programmers Explain How They Think (Theory in Practice). O'Reilly. p. 618. ISBN 978-0-596-51004-6.
