= SOAtest =

Testing and analysis software for APIs

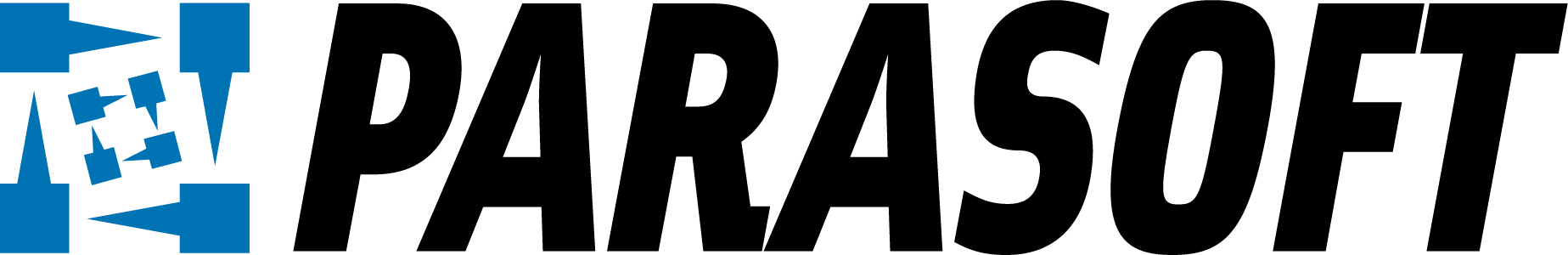
- Developer(s): Parasoft
- Initial release: 2002; 23 years ago
- Stable release: 2025.2 / July 22, 2025; 0 days ago
- Operating system: Linux, Mac OS X, Solaris, Windows
- Type: Testing, API testing
- License: Proprietary commercial software
- Website: www.parasoft.com/products/soatest/

Parasoft SOAtest is a testing and analysis tool suite for testing and validating APIs and API-driven applications (e.g., cloud, mobile apps, SOA). Basic testing functionality include functional unit testing, integration testing, regression testing, system testing, security testing, simulation and mocking, runtime error detection, web UI testing, interoperability testing, WS-* compliance testing, and load testing.

Supported technologies include Web services, REST, JSON, MQ, JMS, TIBCO, HTTP, XML, EDI, mainframes, and custom message formats.

Parasoft SOAtest introduced Service virtualization via server emulation and stubs in 2002; by 2007, it provided an intelligent stubs platform that emulated the behavior of dependent services that were otherwise difficult to access or configure during development and testing. Extended service virtualization functionality is now in Parasoft Virtualize, while SOAtest provides intelligent stubbing.
