= DevPartner =

Software development and testing tool

DevPartner is a set of software development and testing tools developed by NuMega, acquired by Compuware in 1997, which on June 1, 2009 sold it to Micro Focus. There are two versions: one for native and .NET Windows applications, and another for Java applications. It is currently sold by Micro Focus.

== DevPartner Studio ==
DevPartner Studio (DPS)
- Original author: NuMega
- Developer: Micro Focus
- Stable release: 11.5 build 4086 / September 28, 2020
- Written in: C++
- Operating system: Windows
- Type: Profiler / Memory debugger
- License: Proprietary
- Website: www.microfocus.com/products/devpartner/

DevPartner Studio (DPS) is a suite of tools allowing a developer to analyze native (unmanaged) and .NET (managed) code for:

- Code quality and complexity
- Memory leak detection
- Memory optimization
- Performance analysis (timing)
- Performance expert (CPU, disk and network resource usage)
- Code coverage analysis
- Fault simulation (both .NET and environmental)
- Error detection and interop monitoring for C/C++ using BoundsChecker technology.

Each analysis can be configured to show detail at the method or line level.

DevPartner Studio integrates with all versions of Microsoft Visual Studio from 2005 through 2019, providing toolbar buttons and menu options to access all of the tools. All of the tools can also be run from the command line allowing for automation and continuous integrated testing processes to be set up.

== DevPartner Java Edition ==
DevPartner Java Edition (DPJ)
- Original author: NuMega
- Developer: Micro Focus
- Stable release: 4.5 / October 30, 2009
- Written in: Java, C++
- Operating system: Windows
- Type: Profiler / Memory debugger
- License: Proprietary
- Website: www.microfocus.com/products/devpartner/

DevPartner Java Edition (DPJ) integrates a set of functionality enabling developers to analyze Java code for

- Code quality and complexity
- Memory leak detection
- Memory profiling and optimization.
- Performance profiling and optimization.
- Thread analysis and dead-lock detection.
- Code coverage analysis.

DPJ can show the call graph when troubleshooting an issue, and it can dig into details at the method and line level. DPJ integrates with Eclipse 3.2/3.3, OptimalJ, JBuilder, and IBM RAD 6.0 providing menus and tools to access all its functionality. All of the tools can also be run from the command line as well, which enables the possibility of automation and continuous integration.

== See also ==
- BoundsChecker
- Fault Simulator
