= Parasoft DTP =

Software development testing tool

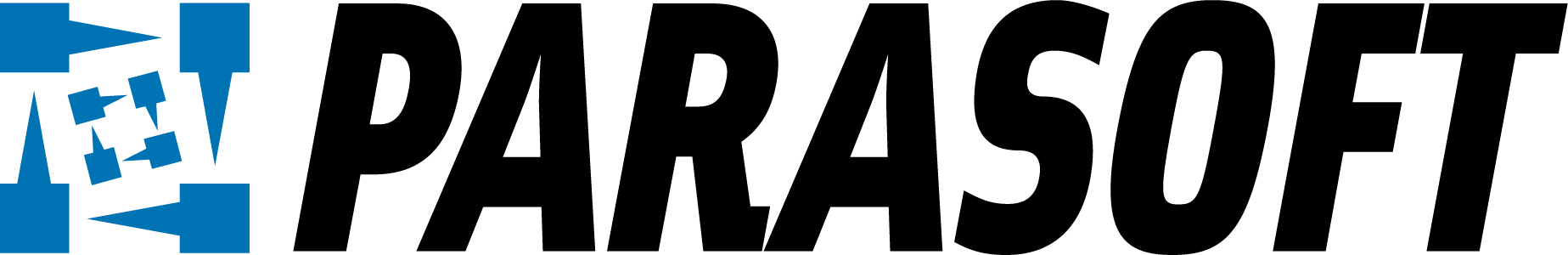
- Developer(s): Parasoft
- Initial release: 2003; 22 years ago
- Stable release: 2024.2 / December 1, 2024
- Operating system: Linux, Solaris, Windows
- Platform: Windows, Linux, Solaris
- Available in: English
- Type: Development testing
- License: Proprietary commercial software
- Website: www.parasoft.com/products/dtp

Parasoft DTP (PDTP) is a development testing and software testing analytics tool from Parasoft that acts as a centralized hub for managing software quality and application security. The software provides a dashboard which aggregates testing results and allows for compliance verification.

== Overview ==
PDTP was introduced in 2009 as Parasoft Concerto. The platform generates software reports from routine software development tasks and compiles information from different software testing procedures to provide a summary of the software's codebase. It comes with built-in algorithms that perform various methods of analysis such as aggregated code coverage and change-based testing.

Features include a user-configurable reporting system with APIs to input data from software development or testing tools, and the ability to integrate with third-party tools. Reports may be used to monitor and analyze how software is being implemented across multiple builds and aggregated across all software testing practices.

In 2012, VDC Research awarded PDTP the Software Embeddy for the 2012 DESIGN East show.

PDTP includes pre-configured templates for:

- American National Standards Institute 62304 for Medical Device Software Development
- DO-178B
- IEC 61508 & Safety Integrity Level
- U.S. Food and Drug Administration General Principles of Software Validation
- ISO 26262 & ASIL
- Joint Strike Fighter Program
- Safety-critical Software Development
- Motor Industry Research Association
- Safety Integrity Level

The templates combine automated testing with the process recommendations and requirements outlined in common guidelines.
