= Electric fence (disambiguation) =

Electric fence is a barrier that uses electric shocks to deter animals from crossing a boundary.

Electric Fence may also refer to:

- Electric Fence, a memory debugger
- "Electric Fences", a song by Damon Albarn

== See also ==
- Electric sport fencing
