= Daikon (disambiguation) =

Daikon is a winter radish native to East Asia.

Daikon may also refer to:

- Japanese radish or true daikon, a Japanese root vegetable
- Daikon (system), a computer program that detects likely invariants of programs
- Daikon Island, Japan
