= Memory debugger =

Software memory problem finder

A memory debugger is a debugger for finding software memory problems such as memory leaks and buffer overflows. These are due to bugs related to the allocation and deallocation of dynamic memory. Programs written in languages that have garbage collection, such as managed code, might also need memory debuggers, e.g. for memory leaks due to "living" references in collections.

== Overview ==
Memory debuggers work by monitoring memory access, allocations, and deallocation of memory. Many memory debuggers require applications to be recompiled with special dynamic memory allocation libraries, whose APIs are mostly compatible with conventional dynamic memory allocation libraries, or else use dynamic linking. Electric Fence is such a debugger which debugs memory allocation with malloc. Some memory debuggers (e.g. Valgrind) work by running the executable in a virtual machine-like environment, monitoring memory access, allocation and deallocation so that no recompilation with special memory allocation libraries is required.

Finding memory issues such as leaks can be extremely time-consuming as they may not manifest themselves except under certain conditions. Using a tool to detect memory misuse makes the process much faster and easier.

As abnormally high memory utilization can be a contributing factor in software aging, memory debuggers can help programmers to avoid software anomalies that would exhaust the computer system memory, thus ensuring high reliability of the software even for long runtimes.

== Comparison to static analyzer ==
Some static analysis tools can also help find memory errors. Memory debuggers operate as part of an application while its running while static code analysis is performed by analyzing the code without executing it. These different techniques will typically find different instances of problems, and using them both together yields the best result.

== List of memory debugging tools ==
This is a list of tools useful for memory debugging. A profiler can be used in conjunction with a memory debugger.

Name	OS	License	Languages	Technique
AddressSanitizer	Linux, Mac OS	Free/open source (LLVM)	C, C++, Rust	Compile-time instrumentation (available in Clang and GCC) and specialized library
Allinea DDT	Linux, Blue Gene	Proprietary commercial	C, C++ and F90. Also for parallel programs on supercomputers	Runtime - through dynamic linking
AQtime	Windows (Visual Studio, Embarcadero IDEs)	Proprietary commercial	.NET, C++, Java, Silverlight, JScript, VBScript	Runtime
Bcheck	Solaris			
BoundsChecker	Windows (Visual Studio)	Proprietary commercial	C++	Runtime intercepts or compile-time
Daikon	Unix, Windows, Mac OS X	Free/open source	Java, C/C++, Perl, and Eiffel	Runtime dynamic invariant detection
Debug_new	(general technique)	(general technique)	C++	Compile-time override
Deleaker	Windows (standalone, and plugins for Visual Studio, RAD Studio, Qt Creator, CLion)	Proprietary commercial	C++, .Net, Delphi	Runtime intercepts
dmalloc	Any	Free/open source (ISC License)	C	Compile-time override
DynamoRIO § Dr. Memory	Android, Linux, Windows	Free/open source (LGPL and BSD)	Any	Runtime intercepts
Electric Fence	Unix	GNU GPL	C, C++	Compile-time override
FASTMM4	Windows	GNU GPL	Delphi	Compile-time override
IBM Rational Purify	Unix, Windows	Proprietary commercial	C++, Java, .NET	Runtime
Insure++	Windows (Visual Studio plugin), Unix	Proprietary commercial	C, C++	source code instrumentation
Intel Inspector	Windows (Visual Studio), Linux	Proprietary commercial	C, C++, Fortran	Runtime
libcwd	Linux (gcc)	Free/open source	C, C++	Compile-time override
libumem	Solaris	Bundled with Solaris		Link-time override
Memwatch	Any (programming library)	Free/open source	C	Compile-time override
mtrace	Various	GNU LGPL	GNU C library	Built-in, outputs accesses
MTuner	Various	Free	C, C++	Runtime intercepts, Link-time override (MSVC, Clang and GCC), Leak detection
Oracle Solaris Studio (formerly Sun Studio Runtime Checking)	Linux, Solaris	Proprietary freeware	C, C++, Fortran	
OLIVER (APT international)	MVS, MVS/EXA, DOS/VSE	Proprietary software	IBM Assembler	Runtime intercepts, Hypervisor - Type 2
TotalView	Unix, Mac OS X	Proprietary commercial	C, C++, Fortran	Runtime
Valgrind § Memcheck	Linux, FreeBSD, Solaris/illumos, Mac OS, Android	GNU GPL	Any	Runtime intercepts
WinDbg	Windows	Proprietary freeware	C, C++, .NET, Python	Runtime

== See also ==
- Profiling (computer programming)
- List of performance analysis tools
- Debugger
- Runtime error detection
- Software testing
- Software engineering
- Computer programming
- Core dump
