= Parasoft Virtualize =

Web service development tool

Virtualize
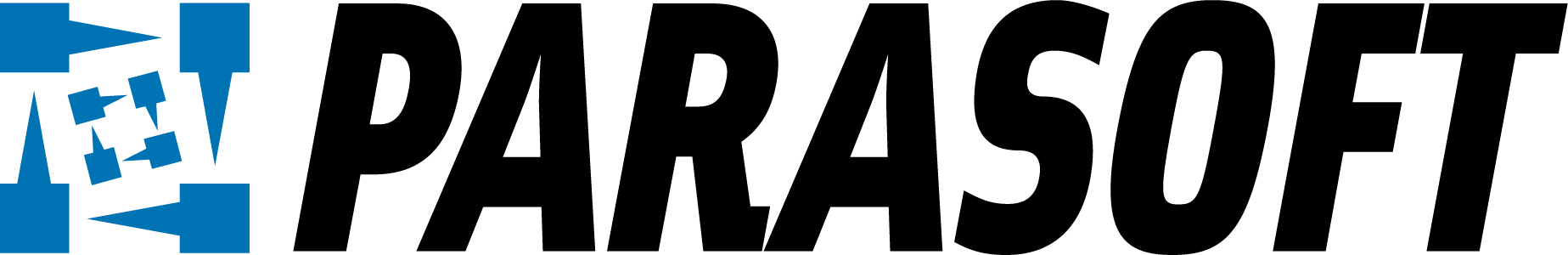
- Developer: Parasoft
- Release: 2011; 15 years ago
- Stable release: 2025.2 / July 22, 2025
- Operating system: Cross Platform: Linux, Mac OS X, Solaris, Windows
- Type: Testing
- License: Proprietary commercial software
- Website: www.parasoft.com/products/virtualize

Parasoft Virtualize is a service virtualization product that can create, deploy, and manage simulated test environments for software development and software testing purposes. These environments simulate the behavior of dependent resources that are unavailable, difficult to access, or difficult to configure for development or testing. It simulates the behavior of dependent resources such as mainframes, ERP systems, databases, web services, third-party information systems, or other systems that are out of direct developer/tester control. The product is used in conjunction with hardware/OS virtualization to provide developers and testers with the resources they need to execute their development and testing tasks earlier, faster, or more completely. Its technologies for automating continuous testing are used as part of continuous delivery, continuous integration, and continuous release.

== Background ==
In 2002, Parasoft released technology to "create service implementation stubs which emulate critical functionality that cannot be made available for testing.". This technology was introduced in Parasoft SOAtest. Since 2002, the technology was extended with "intelligent stubs [that] emulate the behaviour of a running system, allowing the developer to test services in the context of an application's actual behaviour and not on the live running system.". In 2009, the technology was extended with "application behavior virtualization," which can "create copies of both applications and back-end systems so a developer can reference such applications or systems when developing software." The technology was extended and released as a separate product in 2011.

Parasoft created a free community edition in 2017 that allows individual users and small projects to use service virtualization at no cost.

== See also ==
- Service virtualization
- Automated testing
- Software testing
- Agile software development
- Software performance testing
