= Plumbr =

Company based in Estonia

Plumbr OÜ
- Company type: Private
- Industry: Application Performance Monitoring tools
- Founded: 2011
- Founders: Priit Potter, Ivo Mägi, Vladimir Šor, Nikita Salnikov-Tarnovski
- Defunct: 2020
- Fate: acquired by Splunk
- Headquarters: Tartu, Estonia; Tallinn, Estonia
- Products: Plumbr Browser Agent, Plumbr Java Agent
- Number of employees: 17
- Website: plumbr.io

Plumbr was an Estonian software product company founded in late 2011 that developed performance monitoring software. The Plumbr product was built on top of a proprietary algorithm that automatically detected the root causes of performance issues by interpreting application performance data. In October 2020, Plumbr was acquired by Splunk.

== Products ==
Plumbr monitored customers' JVM applications for memory leaks, garbage collection pauses and locked threads. Plumbr problem detection algorithms were based on analysis of performance data of thousands of applications.

Plumbr consisted of an agent and a portal. Plumbr Agent was attached to application runtime and sent memory usage and garbage collection information to Plumbr Portal. On Plumbr Portal one could see information such as heap and permgen memory usage, garbage collection pauses' and lock contention duration. Clients that were not able to send data to third parties could order a self-hosted portal and have a full solution in-house.

In case of performance incidents Plumbr provided its users with information on problem severity and problem's root cause location in source code or runtime configuration, and listed the steps needed to take to remediate the problem.

Clients included NASA, NATO, Dell, HBO, Experian, EMC Corporation.
