= Parasoft =

American software company

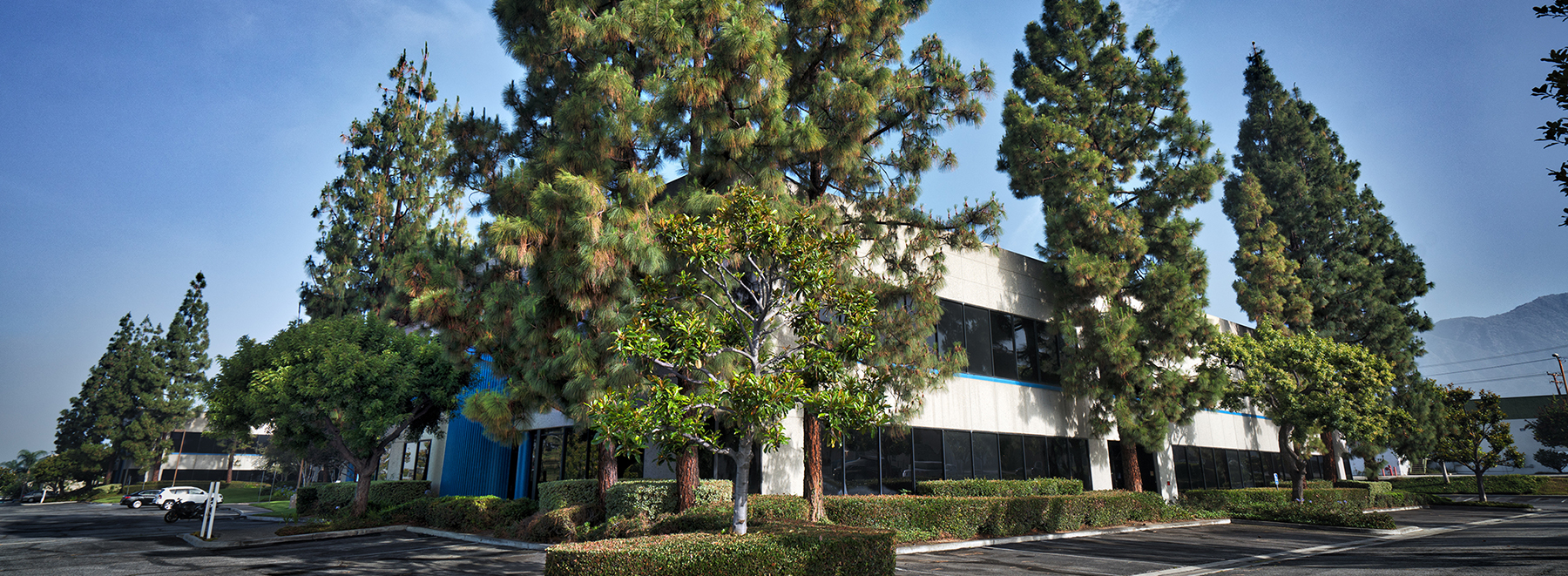
- Headquarters building in Monrovia, California
- Type: Private
- Industry: Computer software, Software testing
- Founded: 1987; 39 years ago in Pasadena, California, USA
- Founders: Adam Kolawa; Jon Flower; Marc Goroff
- Headquarters: Monrovia, California, USA
- Number of locations: 9
- Area served: Worldwide
- Key people: Elizabeth Kolawa; (CEO); Dave Vano; (CRO); Igor Kirilenko; (CPO); Adam Sontag; (CFO)
- Products: C/C++test; Jtest; dotTEST; Insure++; Selenic; SOAtest; Virtualize; Continuous Testing Platform; DTP
- Subsidiaries: Parasoft Deutschland GmbH; Parasoft India Private Limited; Parasoft Netherlands BV; Parasoft Polska Sp. z o.o.; Parasoft Shanghai Co. Ltd; Parasoft South East Asia Pte Ltd; Parasoft Sweden AB; Parasoft UK Limited
- Website: www.parasoft.com

Parasoft Corporation is an independent software vendor that develops automated software testing and application security tools, with headquarters in Monrovia, California. It was founded in 1987 by four graduates of the California Institute of Technology who intended to commercialize parallel computing software tools developed for the Caltech Cosmic Cube project. The Cosmic Cube was the first operational hypercube computer.

During the 1990s, Parasoft transitioned its parallel software technology into automated testing tools for both traditional and parallel software development. Beginning with runtime error detection for C and C++ via its Insure++ product, the company expanded its suite to include static code analysis, unit testing, application security, functional testing, and service virtualization.

== Technologies ==
Parasoft develops defect prevention software that automates coding practices for Java, C, C++, and .NET. The static code analysis functionality checks code for compliance, security vulnerabilities, performance issues, and maintainability. In 1996, Parasoft filed a patent application for rule-based static code analysis. This technology was subsequently expanded to incorporate security static analysis, data flow analysis, and software metrics.

The company also patented an automated unit test case generation system in 1996. This technology has since been integrated with code coverage analysis, regression testing, and traceability tracking. For peer code reviews, the platform automates the preparation, notification, and tracking stages, while the source code inspection itself remains manual.

For cloud, service-oriented architecture (SOA), APIs, and enterprise computing environments, Parasoft provides tools to automate API testing, integration testing, system testing, load testing, and penetration testing. The company's first web services and SOA testing tools were introduced in 2002.

Additionally, Parasoft produces memory error detection software to locate runtime errors within C and C++ programs. In 2025, the company integrated an artificial intelligence assistant into its C/C++test environment.

For service virtualization, the technology simulates dependent system behaviors, such as mainframes or third-party components, when those assets are unavailable for development or staging purposes. These tools are utilized by organizations to track regulatory compliance and establish automated workflows within Agile, DevOps, continuous delivery, and continuous testing frameworks.
