= Bcheck =

In Solaris, bcheck (batch utility for Runtime Checking (RTC)) is a memory access and memory leak checking tool based on dbx. It is commonly used in software development to detect and diagnose memory-related errors in programs.

This tool helps developers by identifying issues such as invalid memory accesses, uninitialized memory reads, and memory leaks during the runtime of a program. Additionally, `bcheck` integrates seamlessly with other debugging and profiling tools, making it a versatile choice for comprehensive software analysis.
