= Fault Simulator =

Software development tool

DevPartner Fault Simulator is a software development tool used to simulate application errors. It helps developers and quality assurance engineers write, test and debug those parts of the software responsible for handling fault situations which can occur within applications. The target application, where faults are simulated, behaves as if those faults were the result of a real software or hardware problem which the application could face.

DevPartner Fault Simulator works with applications written for Microsoft Windows and .NET platforms and is integrated with the Microsoft Visual Studio development environment.

DevPartner Fault Simulator belonged to the DevPartner family of products offered by Compuware. At some point before the product line was sold to Micro Focus in 2009, the product was retired.

== See also ==
- NuMega
