= Memwatch =

Memwatch is a free programming tool for memory leak detection in C, released under the GNU General Public License.

It is designed to compile and run on any system which has an ANSI C compiler. While it is primarily intended to detect and diagnose memory leaks, it can also be used to analyze a program's memory usage from its provided logging facilities. Memwatch differs from most debugging software because it is compiled directly into the program which will be debugged, instead of being compiled separately and loaded into the program at runtime.

== See also ==
- Memory management
- Memory debugger
