= NuMega =

American software company, 1987–1997

NuMega Technologies, Inc.
- Industry: Software
- Founded: 1987; 39 years ago in Nashua, New Hampshire, United States
- Defunct: 1997; 29 years ago
- Fate: Acquired by Compuware
- Headquarters: Nashua, New Hampshire
- Products: See § Notable products

NuMega Technologies was a software company founded in 1987 by Frank Grossman and Jim Moskun in Nashua, New Hampshire. The company specialised in developer tools, including debuggers, profilers and runtime error-detection utilities for MS-DOS and the Windows NT family. Its best-known product was SoftICE, a kernel-mode debugger that ran below the operating system and was widely used by developers and security researchers.

== History ==
NuMega was founded in 1987 and built its reputation on low-level debugging tools for the Windows platform. Its flagship product SoftICE operated at the kernel level, allowing developers to debug code that would otherwise be invisible to user-mode tools, including device drivers and operating system components.

In 1995, the company acquired the Marquis Computing, Inc. assets VB/CodeReview and VB/FailSafe, and hired its president, Hank Marquis to manage NuMega's Visual Basic product line.

In December 1997, NuMega was acquired by Compuware, becoming NuMega Labs of Compuware. The lab subsequently moved to Merrimack, New Hampshire, and was shut down on 11 June 2007.

In June 2009, Compuware sold the former NuMega product portfolio, intellectual property and remaining staff to UK-based Micro Focus.

== Notable products ==
- SoftICE
- DriverStudio
- BoundsChecker (Automated runtime error detection)
- DevPartner Studio
- DevPartner Java Edition
- SmartCheck (Visual Basic Error Detection)
- TrueTime (Profiling)
- TrueCoverage (Code coverage)
- CodeReview (Source code based error detection)
- FailSafe (Improved Visual Basic error handling)
- DevPartner SecurityChecker
- DevPartner Fault Simulator
- CV/1 (Microsoft CodeView on a single monitor)
- Magic CV (Microsoft CodeView running in less RAM)

== Notable employees ==
- Mark Russinovich — software developer who began his career at NuMega and later became CTO of Microsoft Azure
- Hank Marquis — joined with the Marquis Computing acquisition; later a Leadership Partner at Gartner
