= Caltech Cosmic Cube =

Parallel computer

The Caltech Cosmic Cube was a parallel computer, developed by Charles Seitz and Geoffrey C Fox from 1981 onward. It was the first working hypercube built.

It was an early attempt to capitalise on VLSI to speed up scientific calculations at a reasonable cost. Using commodity hardware and an architecture suited to the specific task (QCD), Fox and Seitz demonstrated that this was indeed possible.

In 1984 a group at Intel including Justin Rattner and Cleve Moler developed the Intel iPSC inspired by the Cosmic Cube. In 1987 several people in the group formed a company called Parasoft to commercialize the message passing interface developed for the Cosmic Cube.

== Characteristics ==
- 64 Intel 8086/87 processors
- 128kB of memory per processor
- 6-dimensional hypercube network, i. e. each processor can directly exchange data with six other processors.
