= Daikon (system) =

Daikon is a computer program that detects likely invariants of programs. An invariant is a condition that always holds true at certain points in the program. It is mainly used for debugging programs in late development, or checking modifications to existing code.

== Properties ==
Daikon can detect properties in C, C++, Java, Perl, and IOA programs, as well as spreadsheet files or other data sources. Daikon is easy to extend and is free software.
