= Insure++ =

Memory debugger software

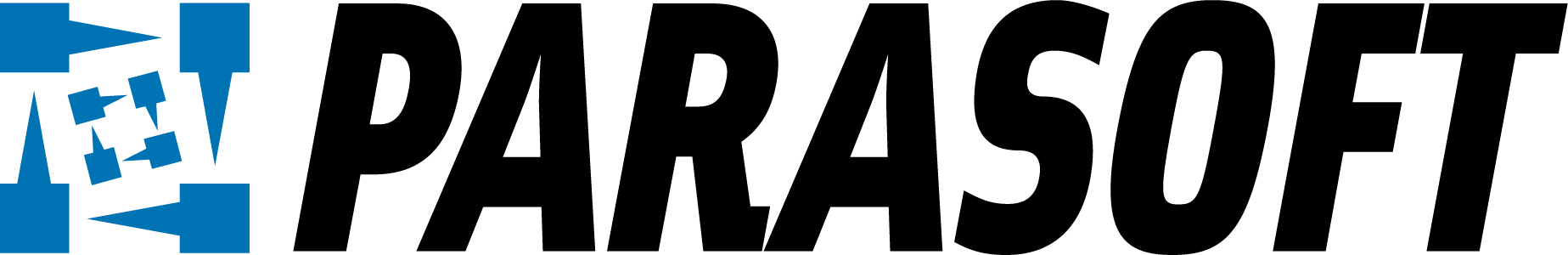
- Developer: Parasoft
- Release: 1993; 33 years ago
- Stable release: 2021.2 / October 28, 2021
- Operating system: Cross-platform, Linux, Solaris, Windows
- Available in: English
- Type: Profiler / Memory debugger
- License: Proprietary commercial software
- Website: www.parasoft.com/products/insure

Insure++ is a memory debugger computer program, used by software developers to detect various errors in programs written in C and C++. It is made by Parasoft, and is functionally similar to other memory debuggers, such as Purify, Valgrind and Dr Memory.

== Overview ==
Insure++ can automatically find erroneous accesses to freed memory (use-after-free situations), array-bounds violations, freeing unallocated memory (which often happens when a programmer frees the same memory twice, or when he frees global or stack memory), and many others.

Unlike Purify and Valgrind, Insure++ inserts its instrumentation at the source-code level, which allows it to detect errors that the other tools miss. In particular, Insure++ can detect buffer overflows in automatic arrays, and overflows which involve pointers that accidentally "jump" from one valid memory region to another, as in the following example:

#include <stdlib.h>
int main()
 {
    char *p = malloc(1024); /* first dynamically-allocated block */
    char *q = malloc(1024); /* second block */
    p += 1200; /* At this point, "p" is likely to point into the second block. 
                  However, false assumptions about the real behaviour lead to mistakes. */
    *p = 'a';  /* invalid write (past the end of the first block) */
 }

The source-level instrumentation allows it to not only identify that a leak occurred, but where it occurred. Some tools merely provide information about where the memory was allocated, Insure++ also gives a stack trace for when/where the actual leak occurred.

Additionally, Insure++ will produce Linear Code Sequence and Jump Code Coverage metrics for all tested code.

== See also ==
- Runtime error detection
- Software development
