= List of debuggers =

This is a list of debuggers: computer programs that are used to test and debug other programs.

== Debuggers ==
- Advanced Debugger (adb) — an older UNIX debugger dating back to Seventh Edition UNIX
- Allinea DDT — graphical debugger for debugging multithreaded and multiprocess applications on Linux platforms
- AQtime — profiler and memory/resource debugger for Windows
- ARM Development Studio 5 (DS-5)
- CA/EZTEST — was a CICS interactive test/debug software package
- CodeView — was a debugger for the DOS platform
- dbx — a proprietary source-level debugger for Pascal/Fortran/C/C++ on UNIX platforms
- DEBUG — the built-in debugger of DOS and Microsoft Windows
- Dragonfly (Opera) — JavaScript and HTML DOM debugger
- Dr. Memory — a DynamoRIO-based memory debugger
- Dynamic debugging technique (DDT), and its octal counterpart Octal Debugging Technique
- FusionDebug — interactive debugger for Adobe ColdFusion, Railo, and Lucee CFML Engines
- GNU Debugger - A popular multi-platform debugger from GNU
- Parasoft Insure++ — a multi-platform memory debugger
- Intel Debugger
- Interactive Disassembler (IDA Pro)
- Java Platform Debugger Architecture
- Jinx — a whole-system debugger for heisenbugs. It works transparently as a device driver.
- LLDB - A multi-platform debugger from the LLVM Project
- MacsBug — a debugger for the classic Mac OS
- Memcheck — a Valgrind-based memory debugger
- Modular Debugger — a C/C++ source level debugger for Solaris and derivates
- OllyDbg — a disassembly-based debugger for Windows (GUI)
- Omniscient Debugger — Forward and backward debugger for Java
- PLS Universal Debug Engine — Multicore debugger and trace-tool for embedded systems
- Rational Purify (IBM) — multi-platform memory debugger
- SIMMON (Simulation Monitor)
- SoftICE — kernel mode debugger for Windows
- SEGGER Ozone — debugger and performance analyser for embedded systems
- TRACE32 — in-circuit debugger for embedded systems
- Turbo Debugger — Pascal/C/assembly debugger for DOS
- Undo LiveRecorder — C, C++, Go, Rust, Java time travel debugger
- Ups — C, Fortran source level debugger
- Valgrind — Valgrind is a programming tool for memory debugging, memory leak detection, and profiling.
- VB Watch — debugger for Visual Basic 6.0
- Visual Studio Debugger — debugger for .NET and native Windows applications
- WinDbg — multipurpose debugger for Windows
- Xdebug — PHP debugger and profiler
- x64dbg — Open-source debugger for Windows

== Debugger front-ends ==
- Allinea DDT - a graphical debugger supporting for parallel/multi-process and multithreaded applications, for C/C++ and F90.
- DDD is the standard front-end from the GNU Project. It is a complex tool that works with most common debuggers (GDB, jdb, Python debugger, Perl debugger, Tcl, and others) natively or with some external programs (for PHP).
- Many Eclipse perspectives, e.g. the Java Development Tools (JDT), provide a debugger front-end.
- GDB (the GNU debugger) GUI
  - Allinea's DDT — a parallel and distributed front-end to a modified version of GDB.
  - Code::Blocks — A free cross-platform C, C++ and Fortran IDE with a front end for gdb.
  - CodeLite — An open source, cross platform C/C++ IDE which have front end for gdb, the next version of CodeLite (v6.0) will also include a front end to the LLDB (debugger)
  - Eclipse C/C++ Development Tools (CDT) — includes visual debugging tools based on GDB.
  - Emacs — Emacs editor with built-in support for the GNU Debugger acts as the frontend.
  - Qt Creator — multi-platform frontend for GDB, CDB and LLDB.
  - rr — An open source C/C++ debugger by Mozilla, supporting reproduction of program state and reverse execution
  - SlickEdit — contains a GDB front-end as well.
  - Xcode — contains a front-end for LLDB and GDB.

== Frame debuggers ==
Software specializing in debugging of frame rendering.

- CodeXL — development environment including profiling and debugging
- RenderDoc — multi-platform, open source

== See also ==
- Comparison of debuggers
- Time travel debugging
- Record and replay debugging
