= Comparison of debuggers =

This is a comparison of debuggers: computer programs that are used to test and debug other programs.

Name	First release	Description	Language	OS	Memory protection?	Program animation?	License	Most recent release
adb	1977	Unix standard debugger	Any compiled to machine code	Unix	No	?	Proprietary	
Allinea DDT	2002	Allinea DDT Debugger	Any compiled to machine code	Linux	Offers guard page for memory usage bugs	Yes	Proprietary	5.1, Aug 2015
GDB	1986	GNU Debugger	Any compiled to machine code	Unix-like systems, Windows	No	Yes	GPL	13.2, 27 May 2023
IDB	2012	Intel Debugger	Any compiled to machine code	Windows, Linux, OS X	No	?	Proprietary	13.0.1, 2013
LLDB	2003?	LLVM Debugger	Any compiled to machine code	macOS i386, x86-64 and AArch64, iOS, Linux, FreeBSD, NetBSD, Windows	No	?	Apache License v2.0 with LLVM Exceptions	16.0.5, 2 June 2023
mdb	1999	Solaris standard debugger (adb) successor	Any compiled to machine code	Solaris	Yes (Memory debugger)	?	CDDL	2016
TotalView	1998	Source code and memory serial and parallel debugger	C++, C, CUDA, FORTRAN, MPI, OpenMP	Linux, AIX, Solaris, OS X, Cray, Blue Gene	Yes (Memory debugger)	Yes	Proprietary	2016.07, Nov 2016
Undo LiveRecorder	1998	Source code and memory serial and parallel time travel debugger	C++, C, Go, Rust, Java	Linux	Yes (Memory debugger)	Yes	Proprietary	6.4, Apr 2022
Valgrind	2007?	tool suite for debugging and profiling Linux programs	C, C++, Java, Perl, Python, assembly code, Fortran, Ada, ...	Linux, Darwin (Mac OS X), Android	Yes	?	GPL	3.17.0, March 2021
Visual Studio Debugger	1995	Debugger in Microsoft Visual Studio	C++, JavaScript, .NET languages	Windows 7, Windows Server 2008 R2, Windows 8, Windows Server 2012, Windows 8.1, Windows Server 2012 R2[4], Windows 10, Windows Server 2016	Yes,(Managed)	Yes	Proprietary	March 7, 2017
XPEDITER	1980?	family of mainframe debuggers	COBOL, PL/1 & Assembler	z/OS	Yes (CICS)	Yes	Proprietary	z2.1, Oct 2014

== See also ==
- List of debuggers
