= FusionDebug =

Computer program

FusionDebug (FD)
- Developer(s): Intergral GmbH
- Initial release: 2005
- Stable release: FusionDebug 3.6 / October 21, 2013; 11 years ago
- Operating system: Windows, Linux, Unix, Mac OS X
- Available in: English
- Type: Debugging tools
- License: Proprietary
- Website: FusionDebug Homepage

FusionDebug an interactive step debugger for CFML, compatible with Adobe ColdFusion, Railo and Lucee. It enables developers to step through code line-by-line, step into, over or out of code to better understand how code is running.

== Features ==
- No code changes.
- Can debug Flex, Ajax, Web Service and Flash Remoting requests.
- Change variables on the fly.
- Debug requests from any user.
- Debug complex applications.
- View stack traces.

== Release history ==
- 2013-October-21 : FusionDebug version 3.6
- 2010-November-09 : FusionDebug version 3.5
- 2009-November-27 : FusionDebug version 3.0.1
- 2009-August-3 : FusionDebug version 3.0
- 2007-May-25 : FusionDebug version 2.0.1
- 2007 : FusionDebug version 2.0
- 2005 : FusionDebug version 1.0
