= Ross Williams (disambiguation) =

Ross Williams may refer to:

- Ross Williams (born 1962), Australian computer scientist and entrepreneur
- Ross Williams, character in Experiment Alcatraz
- Ross Williams (actor) in Gross Misconduct (film)
- Ross Williams, founder of Global Personals

== See also ==
- Roger Ross Williams (born 1962), American director, producer and writer
- Tiffany Ross-Williams (born 1983), American hurdler
