= LLDB =

LLDB may refer to:

- Army of the Republic of Vietnam Special Forces, military units
- LLDB (debugger), a software debugger
