= MDB =

MDB may refer to:

== Computing ==
- .mdb, a file-extension used in certain versions of Microsoft Access databases
- MDB, a kernel debugger for the Linux kernel.
- MDB, the NASDAQ ticker symbol for MongoDB, a database management system.
- Message Driven Bean, a special type of Enterprise JavaBean
- Modular Debugger, a debugger available as part of the Solaris Operating System
- Multidrop bus, a category of computer bus

== Politics ==
- Member of the Bundestag (Mitglied des Deutschen Bundestages, MdB), a member of the German Parliament
- Brazilian Democratic Movement, a centrist political party in Brazil

== Other uses ==
- Multilateral Development Bank
- Maidstone Barracks railway station, UK National Rail station code
- 3,4-methylenedioxybutanphenamine, an entactogenic drug
- Medulloblastoma, common type of primary brain cancer in children
- Mordechai Ben David, American Hassidic singer
- My Dying Bride, a British doom metal band

== See also ==
- 1MDB, 1Malaysia Development Berhad, Malaysian strategic development company
