= Bisect =

Bisect, or similar, may refer to:

== Mathematics ==
- Bisection, in geometry, dividing something into two equal parts
- Bisection method, a root-finding algorithm
- Equidistant set

== Other uses ==
- Bisect (philately), the use of postage stamp halves
- Bisector (music), a half octave in diatonic set theory
- Bisection (software engineering), for finding code changes
- bisection of earthworms to study regeneration
