= Data Display Debugger =

Graphical front-end for command-line debuggers

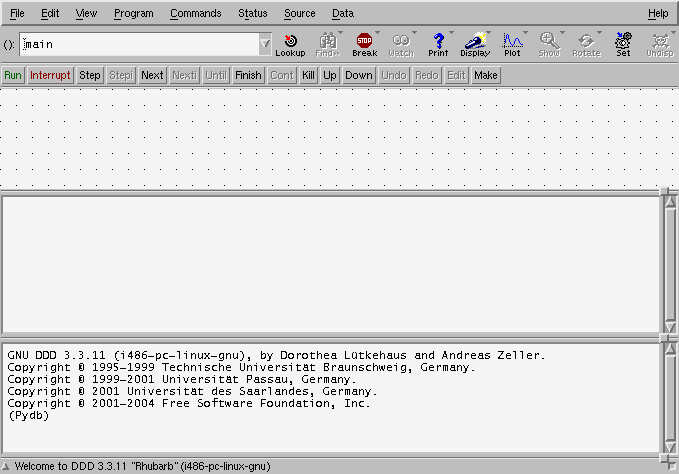
- Developer(s): GNU project
- Stable release: 3.4.1 / 24 August 2024; 12 months ago
- Repository: svn.savannah.gnu.org/viewvc/ddd/
- Written in: C
- Operating system: Linux, FreeBSD, NetBSD, OpenBSD, Tru64, UNIX
- Type: graphical front-end
- License: GNU GPL
- Website: www.gnu.org/software/ddd/

Data Display Debugger (GNU DDD) is a graphical user interface (using the Motif toolkit) for command-line debuggers such as GDB, DBX, JDB, HP Wildebeest Debugger, (Note: The HP Wildebeest Debugger (WDB) is an HP-supported implementation of the GNU Debugger and is available as free software from HP for PA-RISC and Itanium systems.) XDB, the Perl debugger, the Bash debugger, the Python debugger, and the GNU Make debugger. DDD is part of the GNU Project and distributed as free software under the GNU General Public License.

== Technical details ==
DDD has GUI front-end features such as viewing source texts and its interactive graphical data display, where data structures are displayed as graphs.

DDD is used primarily on Unix systems, and its usefulness is complemented by many open source plug-ins available for it.

== See also ==
- Debugger front-end
- KDbg, a KDE debugger front-end
- ups (debugger)
