= Ups (debugger) =

Ups is an open source source-level debugger developed in the late 1980s for Unix and Unix-like systems, originally developed at the University of Kent by Mark Russell. It supports C and C++, and Fortran on some platforms. The last beta release was in 2003.

Unlike more popular debugger stacks for modern Unix platforms, ups is completely self-contained — not merely a graphical front-end to lower-level debuggers like gdb (although some work has been done to make ups usable in that way). The ups user interface is built directly upon the X Window System and SunView, i.e. it does not use an intermediate widget toolkit such as Motif or GTK+.

== See also ==
- DDD, a Motif debugger front-end
- KDbg, a KDE debugger front-end
- Xxgdb, an X Window System debugger front-end
