= Arm DDT =

Linaro DDT
- Developers: Linaro (formerly Arm Forge, formerly Allinea Software Ltd.)
- Release: 2002
- Stable release: 26 / June 2026; 1 month ago
- Operating system: Linux and Blue Gene/Q. (Windows and macOS for remote client)
- Platform: x86-64, Arm, PowerPC, Intel Xeon Phi and CUDA
- Available in: English
- Type: Debugger
- Licence: Proprietary commercial software
- Website: www.linaroforge.com/linaro-ddt

Linaro DDT is a commercial C, C++ and Fortran 90 debugger. It is widely used for debugging parallel Message Passing Interface (MPI) and threaded (pthread or OpenMP) programs, including those running on clusters of Linux machines.

== Debugger ==
It is used to find bugs on both small and large clusters, from 1 to 100,000s of processors. It features memory debugging which detect memory leaks, or reading and writing beyond the bounds of arrays.

It was the first debugger to be able to debug petascale applications - having been used to debug applications running concurrently on 220,000 processes on a Cray XT5 at Oak Ridge National Laboratories. This is possible interactively as the debugger's control tree architecture leads to logarithmic performance for most collective operations. Linaro DDT uses the GNU Debugger as debug engine.

Linaro DDT also supports coprocessor architectures such as Intel Xeon Phi coprocessors and Nvidia CUDA GPUs.

It is part of Linaro Forge - a suite of tools for developing code in high performance computing - which also includes the performance profiler for scalar, multithreaded and parallel codes - Linaro MAP.

As of 2011, 80 percent of the world's top 25 supercomputers on the TOP500 list, use Arm's tools.
