= Record and replay debugging =

Software debugging technique

Record and replay debugging is the process of recording the execution of a software program so that it may be played back within a debugger to help diagnose and resolve defects. The concept is analogous to the use of a flight data recorder to diagnose the cause of an airplane flight malfunction.

== Recording and replaying ==
Record and replay debuggers record application state at every step of the program's process and thread execution, including memory interactions, deterministic and non-deterministic inputs, system resource status, and store it to disk in a log. The recording allows the program to be replayed again and again, and debugged exactly as it happened.

== Usage ==
Recordings can be made in one location and replayed in another, which makes it useful for remote debugging.

Record and replay debugging is particularly useful for debugging intermittent and non-deterministic defects, which can be difficult to reproduce.

Record and replay debugging technology is often fundamental to reverse debugging and time travel debugging.

== Record and replay debuggers ==
- GDB (GNU)
- LiveRecorder (Undo)
- rr (Mozilla)
- TotalView's ReplayEngine (RogueWave)
- PyTrace for Python
