= Delta debugging =

Delta debugging is a methodology to automate the debugging of programs using a scientific approach of hypothesis-trial-result loop. This methodology was first developed by Andreas Zeller of the Saarland University in 1999.

The delta debugging algorithm isolates failure causes automatically by systematically narrowing down failure-inducing circumstances until a minimal set remains. For example, if you can supply a test case that will produce the bug you are looking for, then you can feed that to the delta debugging algorithm, which will then trim lines of code that are not needed to reproduce the bug, until a 1-minimal program is found.

Delta debugging has been applied to isolate failure-inducing program input (e.g. an HTML page that makes a Web browser fail), failure-inducing user interaction (e.g. the keystrokes that make a program crash), or failure-inducing changes to the program code (e.g. after a failing regression test).

Software development tools inspired by delta debugging include the bisect commands of revision control systems (e.g., git-bisect, svn-bisect, hg-bisect, etc.), which, instead of working on the program's code, apply the delta debugging methodology on the code history by comparing various versions until the faulty change is found.

== See also ==
- Bisection (software engineering)
- Program slicing
