= Advanced Debugger =

General-purpose debugger for Unix platforms

adb
- Original author(s): Stephen R. Bourne
- Developer(s): AT&T Bell Laboratories
- Initial release: January 1979; 46 years ago
- Operating system: Unix and Unix-like
- Type: Command

The advanced debugger adb is a debugger that first appeared in Seventh Edition UNIX. It is found on Solaris, HP-UX, SCO and Venix. It is the successor of a debugger called db.

== Overview ==
The initial version was written by Stephen R. Bourne.

ADB was provided with Solaris until Solaris 8 (2000), when it was replaced by the Modular Debugger (mdb) with Solaris 8 (2000) and the ADB command-line interface now is emulated by mdb when it is called as adb. Mdb has become open source with OpenSolaris. The SunOS kernel debugger kadb that was introduced with SunOS 3.5 (1986) is a minor variant of adb.

== See also ==
- dbx
