= Jeff Bonwick =

American software engineer

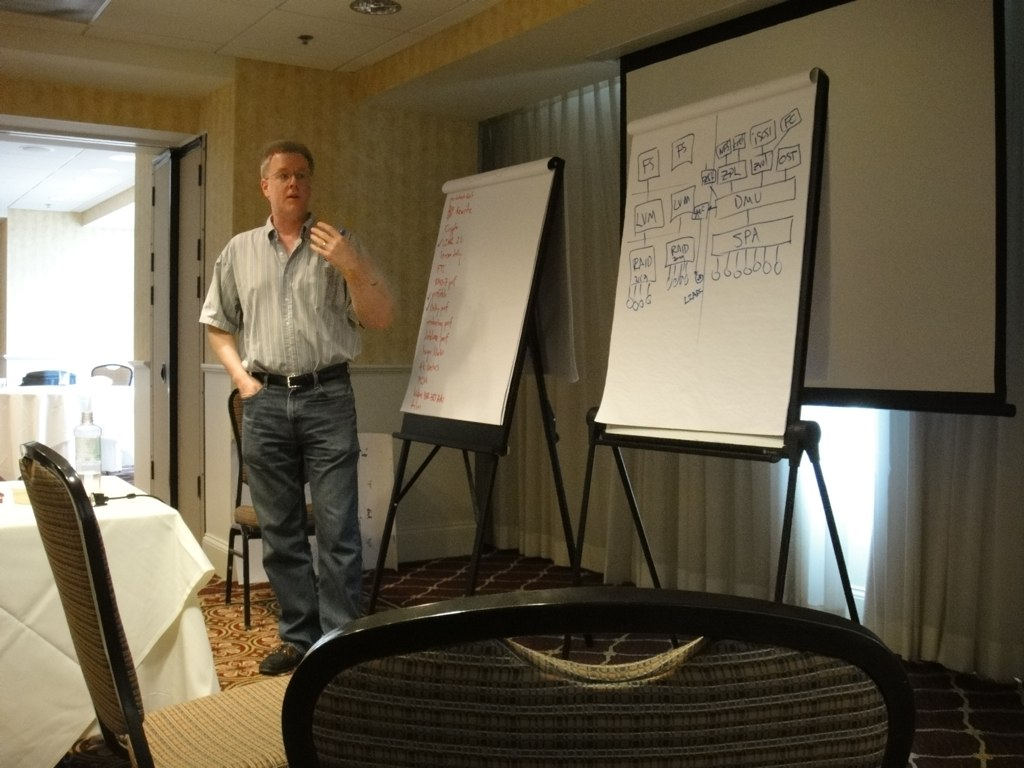
- Jeff Bonwick in 2010
- Occupation: Software engineer

Jeff Bonwick invented and led development of the ZFS file system, which was used in Oracle Corporation's ZFS storage products as well as startups including Nexenta, Delphix, Joyent, and Datto, Inc. Bonwick is also the inventor of slab allocation, which is used in many operating systems including MacOS and Linux, and the LZJB compression algorithm.

His roles included Sun Fellow, Sun Storage CTO, and Oracle vice president.

== History ==
In 2010 Bonwick co-founded a small company called DSSD with Mike Shapiro and Bill Moore, and became chief technical officer. He co-invented DSSD's system hardware architecture and software. He developed DSSD's whole-system simulator, which enabled the team to explore possible hardware topologies and software algorithms. DSSD was acquired by EMC Corporation in 2014, which then became part of Dell Technologies in 2016. By the end of 2016, Bill Moore had left the company, while Bonwick remained as CTO. The DSSD product, called D5, was cancelled in March 2017.

== LZJB ==
Bonwick invented LZJB, a lossless data compression algorithm to compress crash dumps and data in ZFS. The software is CDDL license licensed. It includes a number of improvements to the LZRW1 algorithm, a member of the Lempel–Ziv family of compression algorithms. The name LZJB is derived from its parent algorithm and its creator — Lempel Ziv Jeff Bonwick.

== Iodyne ==
After leaving DSSD, Bonwick co-founded the storage startup iodyne in 2018 with his longtime Sun Microsystems colleague Mike Shapiro, serving as co-president. The company develops Thunderbolt-connected NVMe storage devices aimed at video, photo, and audio professionals launching its first product, Pro Data, in 2022.
