= Mike Shapiro (programmer) =

American computer programmer

- Born: Michael W. Shapiro
- Occupation: Software engineer

Michael W. Shapiro is an American computer programmer who worked in operating systems and storage at Sun Microsystems, Oracle, and EMC.

While working at Sun Microsystems, Shapiro developed pgrep, the Modular Debugger (MDB), DTrace, fault management and diagnosis, and other software for Sun's Solaris operating system.

The pgrep and pkill utilities Shapiro created are today found in every major Unix operating system, including Linux, BSD, and macOS, and are commonly used by system administrators and developers.

Shapiro and the DTrace team received a Technology Innovation Award and Overall Gold Medal for Innovation for DTrace from The Wall Street Journal in 2006. DTrace was also recognized by USENIX with the Software Tools User Group (STUG) award in 2008. Over the next 10 years, DTrace was ported and incorporated into other major operating systems, including BSD and Apple's macOS.

Starting in 2006, Shapiro led Sun's engineering effort to build a commercial storage product using Solaris and Sun's ZFS filesystem, announced in 2008. In interviews with the New York Times and Fortune, Shapiro explained how a small engineering team at Sun dubbed "Fishworks" pitched the project to Sun's executives and developed the product outside of Sun's organizational structure.

After Oracle Corporation acquired Sun, Shapiro managed engineering for storage products as Vice President for Storage. Oracle reported in 2015 that the ZFS Storage product line had surpassed $1 billion in revenue.

Shapiro announced his departure from Oracle in a 2010 blog posting, and was revealed several years later as a member of the founding team of DSSD when EMC purchased the startup. He developed the DSSD software architecture with fellow Sun engineer Jeff Bonwick, and served as DSSD's vice president for software. Shapiro explained how DSSD built the industry's first NVM Express pooled storage system for multiple host computers in a 2016 interview with the Hot Aisle podcast. The DSSD product was used in the TACC 2015 "Wrangler" computer cluster and received HPCwire's Editor's Choice Award later that year.

After EMC was acquired by Dell Technologies, the DSSD group was folded into the EMC storage product division in 2017.

Shapiro was a co-author of the NVM Express over Fabrics storage protocol announced in 2014. By 2019, IDC analysts reported that NVMeoF was disrupting SAN purchasing by offering significant performance improvements for networked SSDs.

== Publications ==
- Bryan M. Cantrill, Michael W. Shapiro and Adam H. Leventhal (June 2004). Dynamic Instrumentation of Production Systems. Proceedings of the 2004 USENIX Annual Technical Conference.
- Mike Shapiro (December 2004). "Self-Healing in Modern Operating Systems". ACM Queue. 2 (9): 66–75. doi:10.1145/1039511.1039537.
- Mike Shapiro (February 2009). "Purpose-Built Languages". ACM Queue. 7 (1): 18–24. doi:10.1145/1508211.1508217.
- NVM Express over Fabrics Protocol and Architecture Webcast
