= Debugging pattern =

Set of steps to correct a software bug

A debugging pattern describes a generic set of steps to rectify or correct a bug within a software system. It is a solution to a recurring problem that is related to a particular bug or type of bug in a specific context.

A bug pattern is a particular type of pattern. The original concept of a pattern was introduced by the architect Christopher Alexander as a design pattern.

Some examples of debugging patterns include:

- Eliminate noise bug pattern – Isolate and expose a particular bug by eliminating all other noise in the system. This enables you to concentrate on finding the real issue.
- Recurring bug pattern – Expose a bug via a unit test. Run that unit test as part of a standard build from that moment on. This ensure that the bug will not recur.
- Time-specific bug pattern – Expose the bug by writing a continuous test that runs continuously and fails when an expected error occurs. This is useful for transient bugs.

== See also ==
- Design pattern
- Architectural pattern (computer science)
