= Global Personals =

- Type: Limited
- Industry: Online dating
- Founder: Ross Williams
- Headquarters: Windsor, UK
- Area served: Worldwide
- Parent: Venntro Media Group
- Website: globalpersonals.co.uk

Global Personals was an online dating company founded and headquartered in Windsor, UK. Part of the Venntro Media Group, Ross Williams, a UK businessman, started the company in 2003 and it has since grown to have three additional offices located in London, New York, and Melbourne. Global Personals employs more than 150 people around the world and possesses a combined portfolio of more than 12,000 dating websites. Business is in liquidation. Ceased trading 2024.

== History ==
Ross Williams founded Global Personals in 2003, teaming up with partner Steve Pammenter. The two funded the project using credit cards, and focused on buying appropriate keywords on Google AdWords for a dating website. They simultaneously worked on building a large database of members in order to launch a private label platform to be used by affiliates and partners in building their own individualised dating websites. The company started out with just one dating site, Singles365.com, which utilised the platform they developed called WhiteLabelDating. This platform was the first iteration of the company's current turnkey dating software. Williams’ work on Global Personals was noticed in the running for Young Entrepreneur of the Year in 2006 for the CBI Growing Business Awards.

== Accusation of fraudulent practice ==
In November 2012, Channel 4 News revealed that the company had created a team of employees whose job was to create fake accounts for its network of websites, in order to send large amounts of flirtatious messages to genuine users. Former employees revealed that their job, the details of which they were not permitted to discuss with anybody outside the organisation, was to search the profiles of genuine members from around the world, select the most attractive photographs, and create artificial profiles, known as "pseudos". Each employee was responsible for managing up to 15 different pseudos.

The purpose of this practice was twofold. Firstly, it was intended to coerce genuine members who had registered for free into paying a membership fee, in order that they could respond to the messages which they had received. Secondly, it was to dissuade paying members from cancelling their monthly subscriptions: the pretence would sometimes continue for months, until the victim put too much pressure on the employee for a real-life meeting, at which point the pseudo would use one of several previously prepared strategies for discontinuing the interaction. In some cases the employee would then target the same member, using a different pseudo.

It was claimed by one of the former employees that this practice increased the company's revenue by 50 per cent. Windsor Trading Standards confirmed that it took claims of fake profiles very seriously and had had "ongoing dealings" with Global Personals regarding this practice. Global Personals claimed to have stopped using fake profiles in 2008: the former employees interviewed by Channel 4 News claimed the pseudo team was wound up in 2010.

== Global Personals today ==
In 2013, Global Personals earned the distinction of being the 13th company in the Sunday Times HSBC International Track 200. The list consists of mid-market companies across Britain and ranks them according to which ones have the most aggressively growing international sales. Global Personals’ revenue is close to hitting £50 million for the year. In addition, Global Personals continues to invest in growth initiatives, including offering affiliates of the FriendFinder platform a chance at a 100 per cent revenue share for the next 6 months if they transition over to WhiteLabelDating.com. The company also recently acquired Smooch.com, one of the leading free/”freemium” dating brands in the UK. The company was moved under the umbrella of Venntro Media Group Ltd in 2016.

== Owned and Operated Web Sites ==
Global Personals owns and operates a number of their own dating site brands. They include Dating Republic, Dating Agency, Love2Meet, Singles 365 and Adult Play among others.

== Web Sites Operated on behalf of Partners ==
In addition to operating their own dating sites, Global Personals also operate over 1,700 sites on behalf of partners according to their website who use a shared set of databases belonging to global personals covering multiple niches including adult, straight, affair and LGBT. Global personals split the revenue of these sites with their partners. In April 2018, Global Personals set about closing thousands of partner websites, with very little notice to the partners, resulting in them moving members to their own dating websites and withholding past and future revenue to hundreds of partners.
