= Dbx (debugger) =

Source-level debugger

dbx
- Original author: Mark Linton
- Developer: Oracle Corporation
- Release: 1981; 45 years ago
- Operating system: Unix and Unix-like
- Type: Debugger
- License: Free for download and use as described in the Sun Studio product license.

dbx is a source-level debugger found primarily on Solaris, AIX, IRIX, Tru64 UNIX, Linux and BSD operating systems. It provides symbolic debugging for programs written in C, C++, Fortran, Pascal and Java. Useful features include stepping through programs one source line or machine instruction at a time. In addition to simply viewing operation of the program, variables can be manipulated and a wide range of expressions can be evaluated and displayed.

== History ==
dbx was originally developed at University of California, Berkeley, by Mark Linton during the years 1981–1984 and subsequently made its way to various vendors who had licensed BSD.

== Availability ==
dbx is provided with AIX, and was also provided with IRIX and Tru64 UNIX.

It is included as part of the Oracle Solaris Studio product from Oracle Corporation, and is supported on both Solaris and Linux. It supports programs compiled with the Oracle Solaris Studio compilers and GCC.

It is also available on IBM z/OS systems, in the UNIX System Services component. dbx for z/OS can debug programs written in C and C++, and can also perform machine level debugging. As of z/OS V1R5, dbx is able to debug programs using the DWARF debug format. z/OS V1R6 added support for debugging 64-bit programs.

GCC removed support for stabs debugging symbols in release 13, so that dbx is not supported as a debugger for GCC-compiled code.

== See also ==
- Modular Debugger (mdb)
- GNU Debugger
