= Undo (company) =

Software debugging company in the United Kingdom

- Type: Private
- Industry: Computer software
- Founded: 2005
- Founder: Greg Law; Julian Smith
- Headquarters: Cambridge, UK
- Website: undo.io

Undo' is a software debugging company based in Cambridge, UK. The company was founded in 2005 by Greg Law and Julian Smith. Undo's time travel debugging technology is used by software engineering teams to debug software programs.

== History ==
Undo was initially bootstrapped in 2005 by Greg Law and Julian Smith out of Law's garden shed in Cambridge. Law and Smith developed the core technology that would eventually become UndoDB, a reversible debugger for Linux software.

LiveRecorder was then developed based on UndoDB to enable development teams to record and replay the execution of software programs.

In 2012, Undo secured its initial seed funding. It closed a $3.3 million Series A funding round in 2016, and a $14 million Series B in 2018.
