= Intel Parallel Studio =

Software development product by Intel

Parallel Studio XE
- Developer: Intel
- Stable release: 2020 Update 4 / 22 October 2020; 5 years ago
- Operating system: Windows, macOS and Linux
- Platform: IA-32 and x64
- Type: Software development kit
- License: Freemium
- Website: software.intel.com/parallel-studio-xe

Intel Parallel Studio XE was a software development product developed by Intel that facilitated native code development on Windows, macOS and Linux in C++ and Fortran for parallel computing. Parallel programming enables software programs to take advantage of multi-core processors from Intel and other processor vendors.

Intel Parallel Studio XE was rebranded and repackaged by Intel when oneAPI toolkits were released in December 2020. Intel oneAPI Base Toolkit + Intel oneAPI HPC toolkit contain all the tools in Parallel Studio XE and more. One significant addition is a Data Parallel C++ (DPC++) compiler designed to allow developers to reuse code across hardware targets (CPUs and accelerators such as GPUs and FPGAs).

== Components ==
Parallel Studio is composed of several component parts, each of which is a collection of capabilities.

- Intel C++ Compiler with OpenMP
- Intel Fortran Compiler with OpenMP
- IDE plug-in integration with Visual Studio, Eclipse and Xcode
- Debugging via Visual Studio Debugger extensions, GNU Debugger extensions
- Integrated Performance Primitives (IPP)
- Math Kernel Library (MKL)
- Threading Building Blocks (TBB)
- Data Analytics Acceleration Library (DAAL)
- Intel Advisor - specialized performance profiler to optimize vectorization and a thread prototyping system for adding / improving threading.
- Intel VTune Profiler (formerly VTune Amplifier) is a performance profiler that analyzes hotspots, threading, I/O, FPGA, GPU, system, throttling and microarchitecture bottlenecks.
- Intel Inspector improves reliability by identifying memory errors and threading errors.
- Intel MPI Library – a multi-fabric message passing library that implements the Message Passing Interface specification across Intel platforms
- Intel Trace Analyzer and Collector - a graphical tool for understanding MPI application behavior, finding bottlenecks and errors in parallel cluster applications based on Intel architecture
- Intel Cluster Checker – Prepackaged checks to diagnose cluster health, functionality and performance. They are accessible via API to embed capabilities into applications.
- Intel Distribution for Python – a Python distribution using Intel Performance libraries to boost performance of NumPy, SciPy, scikit-learn, Pandas (software) and other packages.

== History ==
Intel announced Parallel Studio during their Intel Developer Forum in August 2008 along with a web site to sign up for their open beta program. On 26 May 2009, Intel announced that it had released the product to market. Intel and Microsoft worked together to make their products compatible by adopting a common runtime called the Microsoft Concurrency Runtime, which is part of Visual Studio 2010.

Intel released a new version, Intel Parallel Studio 2011, on September 2, 2010.

Intel released Intel Parallel Studio XE 2013, on September 5, 2012.

Intel released Intel Parallel Studio XE 2015, on August 26, 2014.

Intel released Intel Parallel Studio XE 2016, on August 25, 2015.

Intel released Intel Parallel Studio XE 2017 on September 6, 2016.

Intel released Intel Parallel Studio XE 2018 on September 12, 2017

Intel released Intel Parallel Studio XE 2019 on September 12, 2018

Intel released Intel Parallel Studio XE 2020 on December 16, 2019

Intel released oneAPI toolkits replacing Intel Parallel Studio XE on December 8, 2020

== See also ==
- Intel Concurrent Collections
- Intel Developer Zone
