= Intel Fortran Compiler =

Group of Fortran compilers

- Other names: ifx
- Developer: Intel
- Preview release: 2025.3.1 / November 4, 2025; 4 months ago
- Operating system: Linux, Windows
- Type: Compiler
- License: Freeware, Optional priority support
- Website: software.intel.com/content/www/us/en/develop/tools/oneapi/components/fortran-compiler.html

Intel Fortran Compiler Classic
- Other names: ifort
- Developer: Intel
- Stable release: 2021.10.0 Build 20230609_000000 / July 28, 2023; 2 years ago
- Operating system: Linux, Windows, macOS
- Type: Compiler
- License: Freeware, Optional priority support
- Website: software.intel.com/content/www/us/en/develop/tools/oneapi/components/fortran-compiler.html

Intel Fortran Compiler, as part of Intel OneAPI HPC toolkit, is a group of Fortran compilers from Intel for Windows, macOS, and Linux.

== Overview ==
The compilers generate code for IA-32 and Intel 64 processors and certain non-Intel but compatible processors, such as certain AMD processors. A specific release of the compiler (11.1) remains available for development of Linux-based applications for IA-64 (Itanium 2) processors. On Windows, it is known as Intel Visual Fortran. On macOS and Linux, it is known as Intel Fortran. In 2020 the existing compiler was renamed “Intel Fortran Compiler Classic” (ifort) and a new Intel Fortran Compiler for oneAPI (ifx) supporting GPU offload was introduced.

The 2021 release of the Classic compiler adds full Fortran support through the 2018 standard, full OpenMP* 4.5, and Initial Open MP 5.1 for CPU only. The 2021 beta compiler focuses on OpenMP for GPU Offload. When used with the Intel OneAPI HPC toolkit (see the "Description of Packaging" below) the compiler can also automatically generate Message Passing Interface calls for distributed memory multiprocessing from OpenMP directives.

The Intel Fortran package included the Intel Array Visualizer, a visualization tool for scientific formats such as FITS and netCDF, which can produce x-y plots, contour plots, and image plots, and save them to other formats.

== Optimizations ==
Intel compilers are optimized for computer systems using processors that support Intel architectures. They are designed to minimize stalls and to produce code that executes in the fewest possible number of cycles. Intel Fortran Compilers support three separate high-level techniques for optimizing the compiled program: interprocedural optimization (IPO), profile-guided optimization (PGO), and other high-level optimizations (HLO).

Interprocedural optimization applies typical compiler optimizations (such as constant propagation) but uses a broader scope that may include multiple procedures, multiple files, or the entire program.

Regarding profile-guided optimization, the compiler generates a dataset of performance-related information from using the application with representative workloads, which it then analyzes to find which parts of the application are executed more and less frequently. The compiler uses these data to organize application execution to optimize performance based on how the application is actually used. This is in contrast to IPO which optimizes applications according to the logical flow of the application independent of workloads. The two can be combined to provide workload-based optimizations within which the logical-flow is optimized. Thus, all optimizations can benefit from profile-guided feedback because they are less reliant on heuristics when making compilation decisions.

High-level optimizations are optimizations performed on a version of the program that more closely represents the source code. This includes loop interchange, loop fusion, loop unrolling, loop distribution, data prefetch, and more.

== Standards support ==
The Intel Fortran Compiler Classic fully supports Fortran through the 2018 standard. The Intel Fortran Compiler (Beta) supports full Fortran 77/90/95 and has partial support of the Fortran 2003 standard.

== Architectures ==
- IA-32
- x86-64 (Intel 64 and AMD64)
- Intel Xeon Phi coprocessor
- IA-64 (Itanium 2)
- X^{e} architecture

== Description of packaging ==
The compilers are available standalone from Intel and from APT and Yum repositories. They are also available in the Intel oneAPI HPC Toolkit which includes other build tools, such as libraries, and analysis tools for error checking and performance analysis. Containers with the compilers are on Docker Hub.

== History since 2003 ==
Compiler version	Release date	Major new features
Intel Fortran Compiler 8.0	December 15, 2003	Precompiled headers, code-coverage tools.
Intel Fortran Compiler 8.1	September, 2004	AMD64 architecture (for Linux).
Intel Fortran Compiler 9.0	June 14, 2005	AMD64 architecture (for Windows), software-based speculative pre-computation (SSP) optimization, improved loop optimization reports.
Intel Fortran Compiler 10.0	June 5, 2007	Improved parallelizer and vectorizer, Streaming SIMD Extensions 4 (SSE4), new and enhanced optimization reports for advanced loop transformations, new optimized exception handling implementation.
Intel Fortran Compiler 10.1	November 7, 2007	New OpenMP* compatibility runtime library. To use the new libraries, you need to use the new option "-Qopenmp /Qopenmp-lib:compat" on Windows, and "-openmp -openmp-lib:compat" on Linux. This version of the Intel compiler supports more intrinsics from Microsoft Visual Studio 2005. VS2008 support - command line only in this release.
Intel Fortran Compiler 11.0	November 2008	More Fortran 2003 support. Support for OpenMP 3.0. Source Checker for static memory/parallel diagnostics. Commercial licenses for Windows version include Microsoft Visual Studio 2005 Premier Partner Edition.
Intel Fortran Compiler 11.1	June 23, 2009	Support for latest Intel SSE, AVX and AES instructions. More Fortran 2003 support. Support for latest Intel MKL release (included in compiler products). Commercial licenses for Windows version include Microsoft Visual Studio 2008 Shell and libraries.
Intel Fortran Composer XE 2011 up to Update 5 (compiler 12.0)	November 7, 2010	Coarray Fortran, additional 2003 (FINAL subroutines, GENERIC keyword,) and 2008 (Coarrays, CODIMENSION, SYNC ALL, SYNC IMAGES, SYNC MEMORY, CRITICAL, LOCK, ERROR STOP, ALLOCATE/DEALLOCATE)
Intel Fortran Composer XE 2011 Update 6 and above (compiler 12.1)	September 8, 2011	OpenMP 3.1, additional 2003 (ALLOCATE with SOURCE=, polymorphic source) and 2008 standards support, Windows version ships with Visual Studio 2010 Shell.
Intel Fortran Composer XE 2013 (compiler 13.0)	September 5, 2012	Linux-based support for Intel Xeon Phi coprocessors, support for Microsoft Visual Studio 12 (Desktop), support for gcc 4.7, support for Intel AVX 2 instructions, updates to existing functionality focused on delivering improved application performance. Continued availability of the Visual Studio 2010 Shell for Windows versions.
Intel Fortran Composer XE 2013 SP1 (compiler 14.0)	July 31, 2013	User-Defined Derived Type I/O; OpenMP directives, clauses and procedures; coarrays; Microsoft Visual Studio parallel build support
Intel Fortran Composer XE 2013 SP1 Update 1 (compiler 14.0.1)	October 18, 2013	Japanese localization of 14.0; Windows 8.1 and Xcode 5.0 support
Intel Fortran Composer XE 2015 (compiler 15.0)	August 5, 2014	Full support for Fortran 2003; BLOCK from Fortran 2008; EXECUTE_COMMAND_LINE from Fortran 2008; New optimization report annotates the source from within Visual Studio
Intel Fortran Composer XE 2015 Update 1 (compiler 15.0.1)	October 30, 2014	AVX-512 support; Japanese localization; MIN/MAX Reductions in SIMD Loop Directive
Intel Fortran Compiler 16.0, part of Intel Parallel Studio XE 2016	August 25, 2015	Submodules from Fortran 2008, enhanced interoperability of Fortran with C from draft Fortran 2018, OpenMP 4.1 extensions
Intel Fortran Compiler 17.0	March 4, 2016	OpenMP 4.5 extensions
Intel Fortran Compiler 18.0	January 17, 2017	Full Fortran 2008 support
Intel Fortran Compiler 19.0	September 12, 2018	Some Fortran 2018 features
Intel Fortran Compiler Classic 2021.1.1	December 8, 2020	Full Fortran 2018 support, OpenMP 4.5 and initial Open MP 5.1 for CPU only
Intel Fortran Compiler (Beta) 2021.1.1	December 8, 2020	OpenMP* 4.5 and initial OpenMP support for CPU and GPU Offload
Intel Fortran Compiler Classic 2021.5.0	December 6, 2021	Fortran language fixes and security updates
Intel Fortran Compiler oneAPI 2022.0.0	December 6, 2021	Full Fortran 2003 except parameterized derived types; Full Fortran 2008 except coarrays; Corrections to reported problems
Intel Fortran Compiler oneAPI 2023.0.0	December 21, 2022	Complete Fortran 2003, 2008, 2018 standards; IFX now has Fortran language feature parity with IFORT
Intel Fortran Compiler oneAPI 2024.0.0	November 20, 2023	Adds LLVM sanitizers; Adds initial Fortran 2023 standards support

== Debugging ==
The Intel compiler provides debugging information that is standard for the common debuggers (DWARF 2 on Linux, similar to gdb, and COFF for Windows). The flags to compile with debugging information are /Zi on Windows and -g on Linux. Debugging is done on Windows using the Visual Studio debugger, and on Linux using gdb.

While the Intel compiler can generate a gprof-compatible profiling output, Intel also provides a kernel-level, system-wide statistical profiler as a separate product called VTune. VTune features an easy-to-use GUI (integrated into Visual Studio for Windows, Eclipse for Linux) as well as a command-line interface. In addition to the VTune profiler, there is Intel Advisor that specializes in vectorization optimization and tools for threading design and prototyping.

Intel also offers a tool for memory and threading error detection called Intel Inspector XE. Regarding memory errors, it helps detect memory leaks, memory corruption, allocation/de-allocation of API mismatches and inconsistent memory API usage. Regarding threading errors, it helps detect data races (both heap and stack), deadlocks and thread and synch API errors.

== See also ==
- Intel Integrated Performance Primitives (IPP)
- oneAPI Data Analytics Library (oneDAL)
- Intel oneAPI Math Kernel Library (oneMKL)
- oneAPI Threading Building Blocks (oneTBB)
- VTune Profiler
- Intel C++ Compiler
- Intel Developer Zone (Intel DZ; support and discussion)
- Intel Parallel Studio XE
