= Intel Debugger =

Debugging software by Intel

- Developer: Intel
- Final release: 13.0.1 (2013) / July 31, 2012
- Operating system: Linux and OS X
- Type: Debugger
- License: Commercial, Academic, Eval and, for Linux, for non-commercial uses
- Website: software.intel.com/en-us/compilers

The Intel Debugger (IDB) was developed by Intel and provided support (at various levels depending on compiler product) for debugging programs written in C, C++, and Fortran (77, 90 and 95). It provided a choice of command-line and Java-based graphical user interface (GUI) on the Linux Eclipse platform. The Intel Debugger was a component of a number of Intel software products, such as Intel Parallel Studio and their C++ and Fortran compiler products; it supported parallel architectures including MPI, OpenMP, and Pthreads.

Support for the Intel Debugger has been deprecated — in the Intel Fortran Composer 2013 product — with the last released version being 13.0.1 (2013). For Linux and OS X, Intel supports extensions to the GNU Debugger (the GDB provided with Intel Composer XE 2013 SP1 is based on GDB 7.5). Intel maintains a fork of GDB and works on its relevant bugs to get them implemented upstream. For Windows, Intel supports extensions to the Visual Studio Debugger. The parallel debugger extension enables additional capabilities for debugging parallel programs and is available for Visual Studio (2005 and 2008).

== See also ==
- Intel Parallel Studio
- Intel C++ Compiler
- Intel Fortran Compiler
- Intel Developer Zone (Intel DZ; support and discussion)
