= Integrated Performance Primitives =

Intel Integrated Performance Primitives
- Developer(s): Intel
- Stable release: 2022.2.0 / June 2025; 3 months ago
- Written in: C/C++
- Operating system: Linux, Microsoft Windows
- Type: Library or framework
- License: Proprietary, freeware
- Website: software.intel.com/intel-ipp

Intel Integrated Performance Primitives (Intel IPP) is an extensive library of ready-to-use, domain-specific functions that are highly optimized for diverse Intel architectures. Its royalty-free APIs help developers take advantage of single instruction, multiple data (SIMD) instructions.

The library supports Intel and compatible processors and is available for Linux and Windows. It is available separately or as a part of Intel oneAPI Base Toolkit.

Intel IPP releases use a semantic versioning scheme, so that even though the major version looks like a year (YYYY), it is not technically meant to be a year. So it might not change every calendar year.

== Features ==
The library takes advantage of processor features including MMX, SSE, SSE2, SSE3, SSSE3, SSE4, AVX, AVX2, AVX-512, AES-NI, Intel Advanced Matrix Extensions (Intel AMX) and multi-core processors. Intel IPP includes functions for:

- Video decode/encode
- Audio decode/encode
- JPEG/JPEG2000/JPEG XR
- Computer vision
- Data compression
- Image color conversion
- Image processing
- Ray tracing and rendering
- Signal processing
- Speech coding
- Speech recognition
- String processing
- Vector and matrix mathematics

With launch of the Intel Cryptography Primitives Library in October 2024, the cryptography domain API has been split off and moved into the new library.

== Organization ==
Intel IPP is divided into three major processing groups: signal processing (with linear array or vector data), image processing (with 2D arrays for typical color spaces) and data compression.

Half the entry points are of the matrix type, a third are of the signal type, and the remainder are of the image types. Intel IPP functions are divided into 4 data types: data types include 8u (8-bit unsigned), 8s (8-bit signed), 16s, 32f (32-bit floating-point), 64f, etc. Typically, an application developer works with only one dominant data type for most processing functions, converting between input to processing to output formats at the end points.

== History ==
- Version 2.0 files are dated April 22, 2002.
- Version 3.0
- Version 4.0 files are dated November 11, 2003. 4.0 runtime fully supports applications coded for 3.0 and 2.0.
- Version 5.1 files are dated March 9, 2006. 5.1 runtime does not support applications coded for 4.0 or before.
- Version 5.2 files are dated April 11, 2007. 5.2 runtime does not support applications coded for 5.1 or before. Introduced June 5, 2007, adding code samples for data compression, new video codec support, support for 64-bit applications on Mac OS X, support for Windows Vista, and new functions for ray-tracing and rendering.
- Version 6.1 was released with the Intel C++ Compiler on June 28, 2009. Update 1 for version 6.1 was released on July 28, 2009. Update 2 files are dated October 19, 2009.
- Version 7.1
- Version 8.0
- Version 8.1
- Version 8.2
- Version 9.0 Initial Release, August 25, 2015
- Version 9.0 Update 1, November 17, 2015
- Version 9.0 Update 2, Januar 18, 2016
- Version 9.0 Update 3, May 1, 2016
- Version 9.0 Update 4, September 21, 2016
- Version 2017 Initial Release, September 6, 2016
- Version 2017 Update 1, November 1, 2016
- Version 2017 Update 2, February 23, 2017
- Version 2017 Update 3, April 28, 2017
- Version 2018 Initial Release
- Version 2018 Update 1
- Version 2018 Update 2
- Version 2018 Update 2.1
- Version 2018 Update 3
- Version 2018 Update 3.1
- Version 2018 Update 4, September 20, 2018
- Version 2019 Initial Release
- Version 2019 Update 1
- Version 2019 Update 2
- Version 2019 Update 3, February 14, 2019
- Version 2019 Update 4
- Version 2019 Update 5
- Version 2020 Initial Release, December 12, 2019
- Version 2020 Update 1, March 30, 2020
- Version 2020 Update 2, July 16, 2020
- Version 2020 Update 3, October 21, 2020
- Version 2021 Initial Release
- Version 2021.1
- Version 2021.2
- Version 2021.3
- Version 2021.4
- Version 2021.5
- Version 2021.6
- Version 2021.7, December 2022
- Version 2021.8, April 2023
- Version 2021.9.0, July 2023
- Version 2021.9.1, October 2023
- Version 2021.10.0, November 2023
- Version 2021.10.1, December 2023
- Version 2021.11.0, March 2024
- Version 2021.12.0, June 2024
- Version 2022.0.0, October 2024
- Version 2022.1.0, March 2025
- Version 2022.2.0, June 2025

== Counterparts ==
- Sun: mediaLib for Solaris
- Apple: vDSP, vImage, Accelerate etc. for macOS
- AMD: Framewave (formerly the AMD Performance Library or APL)
- Khronos Group: OpenMAX DL
- NVIDIA Performance Primitives

== See also ==
- Intel oneAPI Base Toolkit
- Intel oneAPI HPC Toolkit
- Intel oneAPI Data Analytics Library (oneDAL)
- Intel oneAPI Math Kernel Library (oneMKL)
- Intel oneAPI Threading Building Blocks (oneTBB)
- Intel Advisor
- Intel VTune Profiler
- Intel Developer Zone (Intel DZ; support and discussion)
