= MOVDDUP =

Instruction for x86 processors

In the x86 assembly programming language, MOVDDUP is the name for a specific action performable by modern x86 processors with 3rd-generation Streaming SIMD Extensions (SSE3). This action involves copying a number to temporary space in the processor for use in other computations.

Specifically, MOVDDUP causes one, double-precision, floating-point source to be copied to both the lower half and upper half of an XMM register.

== Usage ==
Opcode	F2 0F 12 /r
Assembly (Intel syntax)	MOVDDUP xmm1, xmm2/m64
Assembly (AT&T syntax)	MOVDDUP xmm2/m64, xmm1
icc intrinsic equivalent(s)	__m128d _mm_movedup_pd(__m128d a) __m128d _mm_load_pd1(const double * mem_addr)
gcc built-in(s)	v2df __builtin_ia32_movddup(v2df)

The source operand can be either an XMM register (xmm2) or a memory address (m64). When the source operand is an XMM register, the lower half of the register is used in the operation. When the source operand is a memory address, it is assumed to be the address of an 8-byte region, the value at which is used in the operation.

The destination operand must be an XMM register (xmm1).

== See also ==
- MOVAPS/MOVAPD
- MOVHLPS
- MOVHPS/MOVHPD
- MOVLHPS
- MOVLPS/MOVLPD
- MOVMSKPS/MOVMSKPD
- MOVNTPS
- MOVSHDUP
- MOVSLDUP
- MOVSS/MOVSD
- MOVUPS/MOVUPD
- x86 instruction listings
