= MOVAPD =

Instruction for x86 processors

In the x86 assembly programming language, MOVAPD is the name for a specific action performable by modern x86 processors with 2nd-generation Streaming SIMD Extensions (SSE2). This action involves copying a pair of numbers to temporary space in the processor for use in other computations. MOVAPD is one of the fastest ways to accomplish this effect - it is faster than the comparable instruction MOVSD.

Specifically, MOVAPD causes a 16-byte-aligned packed-doubles source to be copied to an XMM register or a 16-byte memory region.

== Usage ==
Opcode	Assembly (Intel syntax)	Assembly (AT&T syntax)	icc intrinsic equivalent(s)	gcc built-in(s)
66 0F 28 /r	MOVAPD xmm1, xmm2/m128	MOVAPD xmm2/m128, xmm1	__m128 _mm_load_pd(double* p)	
66 0F 29 /r	MOVAPD xmm1/m128, xmm2	MOVAPD xmm2, xmm1/m128	void _mm_store_pd(double* p, __m128 a)	

The source operand can be either an XMM register (xmm2) or a memory address (m128).

The destination operand can be either an XMM register (xmm1) or a memory address (m128). Note, however, that the source and destination operands cannot both be memory addresses.

== Potential Exceptions ==
If a memory address operand is not 16-byte-aligned, a general protection exception (#GP) will be raised. This can cause strange interoperability bugs when ordinary code calls an external code that was compiled with the assumption of a 16-byte-aligned stack frame boundary.

== See also ==
- MOVAPS/MOVAPD
- MOVDDUP
- MOVHLPS
- MOVHPS/MOVHPD
- MOVLHPS
- MOVLPS/MOVLPD
- MOVMSKPS/MOVMSKPD
- MOVNTPS
- MOVSHDUP
- MOVSLDUP
- MOVSS/MOVSD
- MOVUPS/MOVUPD
- x86 instruction listings
