= MOVHPD =

Instruction for x86 processors

In the x86 assembly programming language, MOVHPD is the name for a specific action performable by modern x86 processors with 2nd-generation Streaming SIMD Extensions (SSE2). This action involves either copying a number from memory to temporary space or copying a number from temporary space to memory.

Specifically, MOVHPD causes the value at an 8-byte memory region to be either copied to or assigned from the upper half of an XMM register.

== Usage ==
Opcode	Assembly (Intel syntax)	Assembly (AT&T syntax)	icc intrinsic equivalent(s)	gcc built-in(s)
66 0F 16 /r	MOVHPD xmm, m64	MOVHPD m64, xmm	__m128d _mm_loadh_pd(__m128d a, double *dp)	
66 0F 17 /r	MOVHPD m64, xmm	MOVHPD xmm, m64	void _mm_storeh_pd(double *pd, __m128d a)	

The source operand can be either an XMM register (xmm) or a memory address (m64). When the source operand is an XMM register, the destination operand must be a memory address. When the source operand is a memory address, the destination operand must be an XMM register.

Note that the lower half of the XMM register is unaffected by this operation.

== See also ==
- MOVAPS/MOVAPD
- MOVDDUP
- MOVHLPS
- MOVHPS/MOVHPD
- MOVLHPS
- MOVLPS/MOVLPD
- MOVMSKPS/MOVMSKPD
- MOVNTPS
- MOVSHDUP
- MOVSLDUP
- MOVSS/MOVSD
- MOVUPS/MOVUPD
- x86 instruction listings
