= Intel C++ Compiler =

Compiler

Intel oneAPI DPC++/C++ Compiler
- Other names: icx; icpx; dpcpp (icpx -fsycl)
- Developer: Intel
- Stable release: 2025.3.1 / November 4, 2025; 12 months ago
- Operating system: Windows, Linux
- Type: Compiler
- License: Freeware, proprietary
- Website: software.intel.com/content/www/us/en/develop/tools/oneapi/components/dpc-compiler.html
- Repository: github.com/intel/llvm

Intel C++ Compiler Classic
- Other names: icl; icpc; icc
- Developer: Intel
- Stable release: 2021.10.0 Build 20230609_000000 / July 28, 2023; 3 years ago
- Operating system: Windows, macOS, Linux
- Type: Compiler
- License: Freeware, proprietary
- Website: software.intel.com/content/www/us/en/develop/tools/oneapi/components/dpc-compiler.html
- Repository: github.com/intel/llvm

Intel oneAPI DPC++/C++ Compiler and Intel C++ Compiler Classic (deprecated icc and icl is in Intel OneAPI HPC toolkit) are Intel’s C, C++, SYCL, and Data Parallel C++ (DPC++) compilers for Intel processor-based systems, available for Windows, Linux, and macOS operating systems.

== Overview ==
Intel oneAPI DPC++/C++ Compiler is available for Windows and Linux and supports compiling C, C++, SYCL, and Data Parallel C++ (DPC++) source, targeting Intel IA-32, Intel 64 (aka x86-64), Core, Xeon, and Xeon Scalable processors, as well as GPUs including Intel Processor Graphics Gen9 and above, Intel X^{e} architecture, and Intel Programmable Acceleration Card with Intel Arria 10 GX FPGA. Like Intel C++ Compiler Classic, it also supports the Microsoft Visual Studio and Eclipse IDE development environments, and supports threading via Intel oneAPI Threading Building Blocks, OpenMP, and native threads.

DPC++ builds on the SYCL specification from The Khronos Group. It is designed to allow developers to reuse code across hardware targets (CPUs and accelerators such as GPUs and FPGAs) and perform custom tuning for a specific accelerator. DPC++ comprises C++17 and SYCL language features and incorporates open-source community extensions that make SYCL easier to use. Many of these extensions were adopted by the SYCL 2020 provisional specification including unified shared memory, group algorithms, and sub-groups.

Intel announced in August 2021 the complete adoption of LLVM for faster build times and benefits from supporting the latest C++ standards.

Intel C++ Compiler Classic is available for Windows, Linux, and macOS and supports compiling C and C++ source, targeting Intel IA-32, Intel 64 (x86-64), Core, Xeon, and Xeon Scalable processors. It supports the Microsoft Visual Studio and Eclipse IDE development environments. Intel C++ Compiler Classic supports threading via Intel oneAPI Threading Building Blocks, OpenMP, and native threads.

== Architectures ==
According to Intel, starting with the 2023.0 release, Intel oneAPI DPC++/C++ Compiler supports all current Intel general-purpose x86-64 CPUs and GPUs including:

- Processors:
  - Legacy Intel IA-32 and Intel 64 (x86-64) processors
  - Intel Core processors
  - Intel Xeon processor family
  - Intel Xeon Scalable processors
  - Intel Xeon Processor Max Series
- GPUs:
  - Intel Processor Graphics Gen9 and above
  - Intel X^{e} architecture
  - Intel Programmable Acceleration Card with Intel 10 GX FPGA
  - Intel Data Center GPUs including Flex Series and Max Series
- Intel FPGAs

Intel C++ Compiler Classic targets general-purpose Intel x86-64 architecture CPUs including:

- Legacy Intel IA-32 and Intel 64 (x86-64) processors
- Intel Core processors
- Intel Xeon processor family
- Intel Xeon Scalable processors

== Toolkits ==
The Intel oneAPI DPC++/C++ Compiler is available either as a standalone component or as part of the Intel oneAPI Base Toolkit, Intel oneAPI HPC Toolkit, and Intel oneAPI IoT Toolkit.

The Intel C++ Compiler Classic is available either as a standalone component or as part of the Intel oneAPI Base Toolkit.

== Debugging ==
The Intel compiler provides debugging information that is standard for the common debuggers (DWARF 2 on Linux, similar to gdb, and COFF for Windows). The flags to compile with debugging information are /Zi on Windows and -g on Linux. Debugging is done on Windows using the Visual Studio debugger and, on Linux, using gdb.

While the Intel compiler can generate a gprof compatible profiling output, Intel also provides a kernel level, system-wide statistical profiler called Intel VTune Profiler. VTune can be used from a command line or through an included GUI on Linux or Windows. It can also be integrated into Visual Studio on Windows, or Eclipse on Linux). In addition to the VTune profiler, there is Intel Advisor that specializes in vectorization optimization, offload modeling, flow graph design and tools for threading design and prototyping.

Intel also offers a tool for memory and threading error detection called Intel Inspector XE. Regarding memory errors, it helps detect memory leaks, memory corruption, allocation/de-allocation of API mismatches and inconsistent memory API usage. Regarding threading errors, it helps detect data races (both heap and stack), deadlocks and thread and synch API errors.

== Support for non-Intel processors ==
Previous versions of Intel’s C/C++ compilers have been criticized for optimizing less aggressively for non-Intel processors; for example, Steve Westfield wrote in a 2005 article at the AMD website:

Intel 8.1 C/C++ compiler uses the flag -xN (for Linux) or -QxN (for Windows) to take advantage of the SSE2 extensions. For SSE3, the compiler switch is -xP (for Linux) and -QxP (for Windows). ... With the -xN/-QxN and -xP/-QxP flags set, it checks the processor vendor string—and if it's not "GenuineIntel", it stops execution without even checking the feature flags. Ouch!

The Danish developer and scholar Agner Fog wrote in 2009:

The Intel compiler and several different Intel function libraries have suboptimal performance on AMD and VIA processors. The reason is that the compiler or library can make multiple versions of a piece of code, each optimized for a certain processor and instruction set, for example SSE2, SSE3, etc. The system includes a function that detects which type of CPU it is running on and chooses the optimal code path for that CPU. This is called a CPU dispatcher. However, the Intel CPU dispatcher does not only check which instruction set is supported by the CPU, it also checks the vendor ID string. If the vendor string is "GenuineIntel" then it uses the optimal code path. If the CPU is not from Intel then, in most cases, it will run the slowest possible version of the code, even if the CPU is fully compatible with a better version.

This vendor-specific CPU dispatching may potentially impact the performance of software built with an Intel compiler or an Intel function library on non-Intel processors, possibly without the programmer’s knowledge. This has allegedly led to misleading benchmarks, including one incident when changing the CPUID of a VIA Nano significantly improved results. In November 2009, AMD and Intel reached a legal settlement over this and related issues, and in late 2010, AMD settled a US Federal Trade Commission antitrust investigation against Intel.

The FTC settlement included a disclosure provision where Intel must:

publish clearly that its compiler discriminates against non-Intel processors (such as AMD's designs), not fully utilizing their features and producing inferior code.

In compliance with this ruling, Intel added disclaimers to its compiler documentation:

Intel's compilers may or may not optimize to the same degree for non-Intel microprocessors for optimizations that are not unique to Intel microprocessors. These optimizations include SSE2, SSE3, and SSSE3 instruction sets and other optimizations. Intel does not guarantee the availability, functionality, or effectiveness of any optimization on microprocessors not manufactured by Intel. Microprocessor-dependent optimizations in this product are intended for use with Intel microprocessors. Certain optimizations not specific to Intel microarchitecture are reserved for Intel microprocessors. Please refer to the applicable product User and Reference Guides for more information regarding the specific instruction sets covered by this notice.

As late as 2013, an article in The Register alleged that the object code produced by the Intel compiler for the AnTuTu Mobile Benchmark skipped portions of the benchmark code during compilation, leading to falsely increased performance compared to ARM platforms.

== Release history ==
The following lists versions of the Intel C++ Compiler since 1999:

Compiler version	Release date	Major new features
Intel C/C++ Compiler 4.0	1999	Support for Streaming SIMD, enhanced profile-guided optimization, vectorization
Intel C/C++ Compiler 4.5	2000	Support for OpenMP, Itanium
Intel C/C++ Compiler 5.0	2001	
Intel C/C++ Compiler 6.0	2002	Increased Linux support, Auto-parallelization
Intel C++ Compiler 7.0	2003	
Intel C++ Compiler 8.0	December 15, 2003	Precompiled headers, code-coverage tools.
Intel C++ Compiler 8.1	September 2004	AMD64 architecture (for Linux).
Intel C++ Compiler 9.0	June 14, 2005	AMD64 architecture (for Windows), software-based speculative pre-computation (SSP) optimization, improved loop optimization reports.
Intel C++ Compiler 10.0	June 5, 2007	Improved parallelizer and vectorizer, Streaming SIMD Extensions 4 (SSE4), new and enhanced optimization reports for advanced loop transformations, new optimized exception handling implementation.
Intel C++ Compiler 10.1	November 7, 2007	New OpenMP* compatibility runtime library: if you use the new OpenMP RTL, you can mix and match with libraries and objects built by Visual C++. To use the new libraries, you need to use the new option "-Qopenmp /Qopenmp-lib:compat" on Windows, and "-openmp -openmp-lib:compat" on Linux. This version of the Intel compiler supports more intrinsics from Visual Studio 2005. VS2008 support: command line only in this release. The IDE integration was not supported yet.
Intel C++ Compiler 11.0	November 2008	Initial C++11 support. VS2008 IDE integration on Windows. OpenMP 3.0. Source Checker for static memory/parallel diagnostics.
Intel C++ Compiler 11.1	June 23, 2009	Support for latest Intel SSE SSE4.2, AVX and AES instructions. Parallel Debugger Extension. Improved integration into Microsoft Visual Studio, Eclipse CDT 5.0 and Mac Xcode IDE.
Intel C++ Composer XE 2011 up to Update 5 (compiler 12.0)	November 7, 2010	Cilk Plus language extensions, Guided Auto-Parallelism, Improved C++11 support.
Intel C++ Composer XE 2011 Update 6 and above (compiler 12.1)	September 8, 2011	Cilk Plus language extensions updated to support specification version 1.1 and available on Mac OS X in addition to Windows and Linux, Threading Building Blocks updated to support version 4.0, Apple blocks supported on Mac OS X, improved C++11 support including support for Variadic templates, OpenMP 3.1 support.
Intel C++ Composer XE 2013 (compiler 13.0)	September 5, 2012	Linux-based support for Intel Xeon Phi coprocessors, support for Microsoft Visual Studio 12 (Desktop), support for gcc 4.7, support for Intel AVX 2 instructions, updates to existing functionality focused on improved application performance.
Intel C++ Composer XE 2013 SP1 (compiler 14.0)	September 4, 2013	Online installer; support for Intel Xeon Phi coprocessors; preview Win32 only support for Intel graphics; improved C++11 support
Intel C++ Composer XE 2013 SP1 Update 1 (compiler 14.0.1)	October 18, 2013	Japanese localization of 14.0; Windows 8.1 and Xcode 5.0 support
Intel C++ Compiler for Android (compiler 14.0.1)	November 12, 2013	Hosted on Windows, Linux, or OS X, compatible with Android NDK tools including the gcc compiler and Eclipse
Intel C++ Composer XE 2015 (compiler 15.0)	July 25, 2014	Full C++11 language support; Additional OpenMP 4.0 and Cilk Plus enhancements
Intel C++ Composer XE 2015 Update 1 (compiler 15.0.1)	October 30, 2014	AVX-512 support; Japanese localization
Intel C++ 16.0	August 25, 2015	Suite-based availability (Intel Parallel Studio XE, Intel System Studio)
Intel C++ 17.0	September 15, 2016	Suite-based availability (Intel Parallel Studio XE, Intel System Studio)
Intel C++ 18.0	January 26, 2017	Suite-based availability (Intel Parallel Studio XE, Intel System Studio)
Intel C++ 19.0	April 3, 2018	Suite-based availability (Intel Parallel Studio XE, Intel System Studio)
Intel C++ Compiler Classic 19.1	October 22, 2020	Initial Open MP 5.1 CPU only
Intel oneAPI DPC++ / C++ Compiler 2021	December 8, 2020	SYCL, DPC++, initial Open MP 5.1
Intel C++ Compiler Classic 2021.1.2; Intel oneAPI DPC++/C++ Compiler 2021.1.2	December 16, 2020	oneAPI DPC++/C++ introduces support for GPU offloading
Intel C++ Compiler Classic 2022.2.1; Intel oneAPI DPC++/C++ Compiler 2022.2.1	November 2, 2022	Support for latest Intel CPUs, GPUs, and FPGAs; support for upcoming ISO/IEC 9899:2023 (C23) and ISO/IEC 14882:2023 (C++23) language standards
Intel C++ Compiler Classic 2023.0; Intel oneAPI DPC++/C++ Compiler 2023.0	Q1 2023	Support for Intel Advanced Matrix Extensions (Intel AMX), Quick Assist Technology (QAT), Intel AVX-512 with Vector Neural Network Instructions (VNNI), bfloat16, GPU datatype flexibility, Intel Xe matrix extensions (Intel XMX), Intel GPU vector engine, XE-Link

== See also ==
- Cilk Plus
- Data Analytics Library
- Intel Developer Zone
- Intel Fortran Compiler
- Integrated Performance Primitives
- Math Kernel Library
- Intel Parallel Studio
- VTune
- List of C compilers
