= Concurrent Collections =

Programming model for software frameworks

Concurrent Collections (CnC) is a programming model for software frameworks to expose parallelism in applications. The Concurrent Collections conception originated from tagged stream processing development with HP TStreams.

== TStreams ==
Around 2003, Hewlett-Packard Cambridge Research Lab developed TStreams, a stream processing forerunner of the basic concepts of CnC.

== Concurrent Collections for C++ ==
Concurrent Collections for C++ is an open source C++ template library developed by Intel for implementing parallel CnC applications in C++ with shared and/or distributed memory.

== Habanero CnC ==
Rice University has developed various CnC language implementations based on their Habanero project infrastructure.

== See also ==
- Stream processing
- Flow-based programming (FBP)
- Tuple space
- Functional reactive programming (FRP)
- Linda (coordination language)
- Threading Building Blocks (TBB)
- Cilk/Cilk Plus
- Intel Parallel Studio
