= Intel Developer Zone =

International online program by Intel

The Intel Developer Zone is an international online program designed by Intel to encourage and support independent software vendors in developing applications for Intel hardware and software products. This support is provided for the key stages of the business life cycle from planning to development and in various forms: web sites, newsletters, developer conferences, trade media, and blogs.

Products supported through Intel Developer Zone include support for multiprocessor offerings like Intel Threading Building Blocks (Intel TBB) and Intel Parallel Studio, as well as programming tools like Intel's compiler products (Intel C++ Compiler and Intel Fortran Compiler) and Intel VTune Amplifier, and libraries like Intel Integrated Performance Primitives (Intel IPP) and Intel Math Kernel Library (Intel MKL).

== Websites ==
The primary web presence at software.intel.com is a collection of sites for the developer community that are authored both by Intel and by the community at large. These sites include forums, documentation and knowledge papers, confidential online support and download areas. Access is available on a no-charge level.

Intel Developer Zone program has combined many of the earlier Intel software programs including: the Intel AppUp Developer Program, the Intel Software Partner Program, and the Intel Software Network (ISN). The Intel Software Network (ISN) is a former open program. Subscription members of the former Intel Software Partner Program were automatically included in ISN.

== See also ==
- Intel Developer Forum
