= VTune =

X86 CPU performance profiling software

VTune Profiler
- Developer(s): Intel Developer Products
- Stable release: 2024.2 / June 18, 2024; 15 months ago
- Operating system: Windows and Linux (UI-only on macOS)
- Type: Profiler
- License: Free and Commercial Support
- Website: software.intel.com/content/www/us/en/develop/tools/oneapi/components/vtune-profiler.html

VTune Profiler (formerly VTune Amplifier) is a performance analysis tool for x86-based machines running Linux or Microsoft Windows operating systems. Many features work on both Intel and AMD hardware, but the advanced hardware-based sampling features require an Intel-manufactured CPU.

VTune is available for free as a stand-alone tool or as part of the Intel oneAPI Base Toolkit.

== Features ==
Languages
C, C++, Data Parallel C++ (DPC++), C#, Fortran, Java, Python, Go, OpenCL, assembly and any mix. Other native programming languages that adhere to common standards can also be profiled.
Profiles
Profiles include algorithm, microarchitecture, parallelism, I/O, system, thermal throttling, and accelerators (GPU and FPGA).
Local, Remote, Server
VTune supports local and remote performance profiling. It can be run as an application with a graphical interface, as a command line or as a server accessible by multiple users via a web browser.

== See also ==
- Intel Advisor
- Intel Inspector
- oneAPI (compute acceleration)
- Intel Developer Zone
- List of performance analysis tools
