= Timeline of Netflix =

Netflix Inc. is an American technology & media-services provider, production company, and owner of the streaming service, Netflix. The company is headquartered in Los Gatos, California and was founded in 1997 by Reed Hastings and Marc Randolph in Scotts Valley, California. This is an abridged history of the formation and growth of Netflix, which has grown to become the largest entertainment company in the United States in terms of market capitalization as of 2020.

== Full timeline ==
Year	Month and date	Event type	Details
1997	August 29	Company	Netflix founded in Scotts Valley, California, by Marc Randolph and Reed Hastings, who previously had worked together at Pure Software.
1998	April 14	Product	Netflix launches its website with 925 titles available for rent through a traditional pay-per-rental model (50¢US per rental U.S. postage; late fees applied).
1999	September	Product	Netflix launches its monthly subscription concept.
2000		Company	Netflix offers itself for acquisition to Blockbuster for $50 million; however, Blockbuster declines the offer.
2002		Competition	Redbox is founded. It offers DVD rentals via automated retail kiosks. A year later, it poaches Mitch Lowe, who was a founding executive at Netflix.
2002	May 29	Company	Netflix initiates an initial public offering (IPO) on the NASDAQ National Market, selling 5.5 million shares of common stock at the price of US$15.00 per share. It brings in $82.5 million.
2003	April	Growth	Netflix announces that it reaches 1 million subscribers.
2004	August 11	Competition	Blockbuster launches Blockbuster online to compete with Netflix, offering unlimited DVD rentals at the flat fee of $19.99/month.
2006	October 1	Company	Netflix offers a $1,000,000 prize to the first developer of a video-recommendation algorithm that could beat its existing algorithm, Cinematch, at predicting customer ratings by more than 10%. and uses the same 2016 icon
2007	January 15	Product	Netflix announces that it will launch streaming video.
2007	February	Product	Netflix delivers its billionth DVD and begins to move away from its original core business model of mailing DVDs by introducing video on demand via the Internet.
2008	March 12	Competition	Hulu, a competing online streaming service, launches for public access in the United States.
2008	August	Product	Netflix experiences a giant database corruption. This drives it to start moving all its data to the Amazon Web Services cloud. It completes its shift to the cloud by January 2016.
2009	June 12	International	Netflix Originals was launched.
2010	September 22	International	Netflix starts expanding its streaming service to the international market, starting with Canada."
2010	December	Legal	The FCC Open Internet Order bans cable television and telephone service providers from preventing access to competitors or certain web sites such as Netflix.
2011	April	Competition	Vudu announces the launch of its online streaming service.
2011	June	Team	Netflix CEO Reed Hastings joins Facebook's board of directors.
2011	September 5	International	Netflix launches streaming service in Brazil
2011	September 7	International	Netflix launches streaming service in Argentina, Uruguay, and Paraguay
2011	September 8	International	Netflix launches streaming service in Chile and Bolivia
2011	September 9	International	Netflix launches streaming service in Andean region, including Peru and Ecuador
2011	September 12	International	Netflix launches streaming service in Mexico, Central America, and the Caribbean
2011	September 18	Product	Reed Hastings says in a Netflix blog post that the DVD section of Netflix would be split off and renamed Qwikster, and the only major change would be separate websites for the services. This change would be retracted a month later.
2011	November	Finance	Netflix stock plunges from 42.16/share in July to 9.12/share in November, as 800,000 subscribers quit.
2012	January 9	International	Netflix starts its expansion in Europe, launching in the United Kingdom and Ireland. By September 18 it has expanded to Denmark, Finland, Norway and Sweden.
2012	April	Company	Netflix files with the Federal Election Commission (FEC) to form a political action committee (PAC) called FLIXPAC.
2012	December	Product	Netflix experiences massive Christmas Eve outage, due to its hosting on Amazon Web Services. Amazon issues apology several days later.
2013	February 1	Product	Netflix starts streaming House of Cards, its first original content.
2013	August 1	Product	Netflix announces a "Profiles" feature that permits accounts to accommodate up to five user profiles, associated either with individuals or themes of their choosing (e.g., "Date Night").
2013	November	Competition	Dish Network announces that Blockbuster will close all remaining stores by the end of the year.
2014	February	Product	Netflix discovers that Comcast Cable has been slowing its traffic down, and announces that it will pay Comcast to end the slowdown.
2014	September 10	Product	Netflix participates in the "Internet Slowdown" by intentionally slowing down its speeds, announcing its opposition to proposed changes in net neutrality rules that act against net neutrality by giving preferred websites the option to pay telecommunication companies for a guaranteed fast lane, in effect slowing down websites that don't pay for that fast lane.
2015	June 24	Finance	Netflix announces a 7:1 stock split in form of a dividend of six additional shares for each outstanding share, payable on July 14 to stock owners of record at the July 2 close. Trading at the post-split price will start July 15.
2015	July	Finance	Netflix announces that its stock has surged to an all-time high (to almost $100/share), a growth of 574% over the past five years.
2015	September 2	International	Netflix launches streaming service in Japan.
2015	October	Product	Netflix announces that it will raise the price of its standard HD plan to $10 per month, up from $9 per month for recent customers. This price hike will be gradually rolled in, a strategy it calls "un-grandfathering."
2016	January 6	International	At the Consumer Electronics Show, Netflix announces a major international expansion into 130 new territories; with this expansion, the company promoted that its service would now be available nearly "worldwide", with the only notable exclusions including China, and regions subject to U.S. sanctions, such as Crimea (Ukraine), Syria, and North Korea.
2016	January	Product	Netflix announces that it will launch originals targeting kids.
2016	February 11	Product	Netflix finishes its massive migration of its data servers to Amazon Web Services.
2016	March	Legal	Netflix states that it sends lower quality video to mobile subscribers on AT&T and Verizon's networks for the past 5 years. Some accuse Netflix of hypocrisy on net neutrality.
2016	May	Partnerships	Netflix partners with Univision to broadcast the first season of its original show Narcos - testing whether airing old seasons on traditional TV can lure people to sign up for its service ahead of the next season.
2016	November 30	Product	After years of requests from subscribers, Netflix rolls out an offline playback feature to all of its subscribers in all of its markets.
2017	October	Competition	A study showed that the number of Netflix subscribers now equal that of all the cable subscribers combined; 73% of all US households.
2018	March	Company	Netflix created Netflix Animation as its first production studio.
2021	November	Product	Netflix launches its gaming platform Netflix Games, available on Android with 5 games on launch. The company also announces plans to expand its gaming service to iOS.
2022	January	Product	Netflix raises prices again and loses 1 million customers
2022	March	Acquisition	Netflix acquires Boss Fight Entertainment, a mobile games developer, their third game studio acquisition after Night School Studio and Next Games.
2023	January	Company	Reed Hastings steps down as CEO.
2023	April	Product	Netflix announces wind-down of DVD.com, with last shipment on September 29, 2023.
2025	December	Acquisition	Netflix announces the acquisition of Warner Bros. Discovery's studio and streaming assets for $72 billion, with a total asset value of $82.7 billion. However on February 27, 2026, Netflix withdrew its bid due to Paramount Skydance confirming its deal to acquire all of WBD for $110.9 billion.
