= IBM DevOps Code ClearCase =

Software configuration management tool

ClearCase
- Original author: Atria Software
- Developer: IBM
- Release: 1992; 34 years ago
- Stable release: 11.0.0.4 / August 22, 2025; 14 months ago
- Operating system: AIX, HP-UX, Linux, Solaris, Windows; z/OS (limited client)
- Platform: AIX: Power ISA, big-endian; HP-UX: IA-64; Linux: IA-32, x86-64, ppc64, ppc64le, IBM Z; Solaris: SPARC, x86-64; Windows: IA-32, x86-64
- Type: Software configuration management
- License: IBM EULA
- Website: www.ibm.com/products/devops-code-clearcase

IBM DevOps Code ClearCase (also known as IBM Rational ClearCase) is a family of computer software tools that supports software configuration management (SCM) of source code and other software development assets. It also supports design-data management of electronic design artifacts, thus enabling hardware and software co-development. ClearCase includes revision control and forms the basis for configuration management at large and medium-sized businesses, accommodating projects with hundreds or thousands of developers. It is developed by IBM.

ClearCase supports two configuration management models: UCM (Unified Change Management) and base ClearCase. UCM provides an out-of-the-box model while base ClearCase provides a basic infrastructure (UCM is built on base ClearCase). Both can be customized to support a wide variety of needs.

ClearCase can accommodate large binary files, a large number of files, and large repository sizes. It supports branching and labeling. It enables the correct merging of refactored files by versioning directories. It also supports extensive process automation and enforcement using triggers, attributes, hyperlinks, and other metadata. It uses the MultiVersion File System (MVFS), which is a virtual file system that transparently determines which versions of files and directories should be in the workspace and orchestrates file access and lifecycle. The MVFS is used in LAN deployments for dynamic views and in LAN or WAN deployments for automatic views.

ClearCase also provides authoritative build auditing, which generates metadata for each build artifact, including the context of the build and a bill of materials of files (including the exact version) referenced during the build. This metadata can be used for generating SBOMs (Software Bill of Materials) and is important in regulated environments where artifact traceability is essential. ClearCase includes an implementation of 'make' that integrates with the authoritative build auditing mechanism to ensure build correctness without timestamps and automatic sharing of build artifacts across views (workspaces).

== History ==
ClearCase was developed by Atria Software and first released in 1992 on Unix and later on Windows. Some of the Atria developers had worked on an earlier, similar system: DSEE (Domain Software Engineering Environment) from Apollo Computer. After Hewlett-Packard bought Apollo Computer in 1989, those developers left to form Atria. Atria later merged with Pure Software to form PureAtria in 1996. That firm was acquired by Rational Software in 1997, which was purchased by IBM in 2003. IBM continues to develop and market ClearCase. In September 2016, IBM announced a strategic partnership with HCL Technologies that will allow for accelerated development.

== Infrastructure ==
The database system that ClearCase uses is RDM Embedded from Raima. In ClearCase terminology, an individual database is called a VOB (Versioned Object Base). On this layer, maintenance takes place using Raima tooling. Around this layer, a set of interfaces with accompanying tools are used to manage the physical database system, which requires specific Database administrator skills.

The most important service is the Atria location Broker Daemon (ALBD), which manages all (LAN) communication between computers. Beginning with version 7, the server platform runs Websphere Application Server with a server application called the Change Management Server (CM Server), which served ClearCase clients via the HTTP Protocol. (Before version 7 there was a web service by which users could access ClearCase via their browsers.) CM server has since been replaced by the ClearCase Remote Client Wide-Area Network Server (CCRC WAN server), which continues to be based on Websphere Application Server.

== Views ==
A distinguishing feature of ClearCase is the MultiVersion File System (MVFS), a proprietary networked filesystem which can mount VOBs as a virtual file system through a dynamic view, selecting a consistent set of versions and enabling the production of derived objects. This was a departure from the repository-and-sandbox model because it enabled the early management of artifacts (that is, before they are checked in) and was not limited to the management of these first-order configuration items.

ClearCase also supports snapshot views, which are copies of repository data. As opposed to dynamic views, snapshot views are maintained on a local (OS-specific) file system and do not require network access. Instead, a snapshot view stores a copy of the VOB data locally on the user's computer. Snapshot views can be used while disconnected from the network and later synchronized with the VOB when a connection is reestablished. This mode of operation is similar to that of CVS (Concurrent Versions System) software.

The dynamic and snapshot view types are supported by the ClearCase local client (CCLC). The ClearCase remote client (CCRC) supports analogous view types: the automatic view and the web view. Both are copy-based, but the automatic view uses the MVFS to support local, shareable pools of VOB objects.

From the perspective of the client computer, a ClearCase view appears to be just another file system. New files and directories created in a ClearCase view are referred as "view-private" to indicate that they are specific to the view and not version-controlled. This feature allows build systems to operate on the same file system structure as the source code and ensures that each developer can build independently of one other. At any time, a view-private object can be added to source control and become a versioned object, rendering it visible to other users.

Developers typically have one or more views at their disposal. It is sometimes practical to share views between developers, but sharing branches is the more common practice. A branch hierarchy is often useful: an entire development project can share a common development branch, while a smaller team can share a sub-branch, with each developer having his or her own private branch. Whenever a change on a branch is deemed stable enough, it can be merged to the parent branch.

== The configuration specification ==
Under base ClearCase, each view is controlled by its associated configuration specification, commonly referred to as a config spec. This is a collection of rules (stored internally in a text file, but compiled before use) that specifies what element versions (files or directories) are to be displayed in a view. To determine which version, if any, of an element should be visible, ClearCase traverses the configuration specification line-by-line from top to bottom, stopping when a match is found and ignoring any subsequent rules. A configuration specification can also reference other configuration specifications by means of an 'include' statement.

In the UCM management model, config specs do not need to be created or maintained manually: they are generated and maintained by ClearCase UCM operations.

== Builds ==
The networked filesystem provided by MVFS allows for build auditing. Builds in views that use the MVFS can monitor and record file I/O operations performed during the build process and associate each such event with the command that triggered it. This allows ClearCase to produce a bill-of-materials which it calls a Configuration Record (CR) for all builds and enable traceability for either software configuration management purposes or as part of a larger application lifecycle management process. Build auditing is performed with command-line tools such as a built-in make tools (omake, clearmake) or by using the clearaudit command, which can invoke another build tool, such as Unix make (1).

The Versioned Object Base (VOB) that stores versions of file elements and directory elements also stores derived objects and metadata associated with these object types.

The bill-of-materials artifact produced as the result of build auditing is known as the Configuration Record. It contains:

- The build procedure: The method (script, makefile, and so on) that invoked the build.
- Inputs: All files (and their specific versions) that were used for a particular build.
- Outputs: All derived object (DO) files (and any dependent DOs) produced as a result of the build.

The dependency information is stored in a configuration record that can be shown for each derived object. The configuration record can be used to create another view that shows all files that have been previously read during the build time. The configuration record can also be used to apply a label to the files (and versions) that were read during the build.

The MVFS allows derived objects that were built in one dynamic view to be automatically "copied" to another dynamic view that requires "exactly the same" derived object. Two derived objects are deemed to be "exactly same" if they have the same configuration record (that is, bill of materials). The shareable derived objects are physically present in the VOB server, not in the views that reference them. This feature is called winking in derived objects and requires that the clearmake or omake tool is used for builds.

ClearCase dynamic views are slower than local filesystems, even with a good network infrastructure. Repeated subsequent builds may run faster, due to build avoidance that is enabled by ClearCase's make substitute. Because MVFS requires server access every time a file is accessed, the performance of the file system depends on server capacity.

== Client types ==
Originally, ClearCase supported only full ("fat") clients running native on Unix and Windows. In version 7, the ClearCase Remote Client (CCRC) was introduced. It is based on Eclipse software and supplied in both fully packaged Eclipse versions, as a plugin-in for Eclipse, and for other environments such as Visual Studio.

Client	Network connection type	Connection to repository of source-controlled objects	View types	User interfaces
ClearCase local client (CCLC)	LAN only	RPC connection to a versioned object base (VOB)	Dynamic, snapshot	ClearTeam Explorer (GUI), cleartool (CLI)
ClearCase remote client (CCRC)	WAN and LAN	http(s) connection to a VOB through a CCRC WAN server	Automatic, web	ClearTeam Explorer (GUI), rcleartool (CLI)

== Integrations ==
Other Rational Software products, notably ClearQuest and Rational Team Concert, are integrated with ClearCase. ClearCase is also integrated with Microsoft Visual Studio, Cadence Virtuoso, and the Eclipse IDE through a plugin.

== Database replication ==
ClearCase MultiSite enables developers at different locations to use the same ClearCase versioned object base (VOB). Each location (site) has its own copy (replica) of the VOB. Data synchronization via any protocol can be unidirectional or bidirectional. Synchronization patterns can be one-to-one (two replicas exchange data), ring (round-robin synchronization), one-to-many (replication from a “hub” VOB) or many-to-many (each replica exchanges data with all other replicas).

== DSEE ==
DSEE (Domain Software Engineering Environment) introduced many concepts that were adopted by ClearCase. The Apollo Domain file system allowed special handler programs to intervene during file access. DSEE made use of this feature to invisibly substitute a versioned copy when a particular file was opened. With the versioning specification resident in the user environment, all accesses to versioned files were redirected, including such mundane accesses as printing, viewing in a generic text editor etc.

DSEE relied heavily on a file that described all the software modules and their dependencies. The file had to be generated manually, which was a major impediment to its use in large systems. However, once generated, it enabled DSEE to calculate the optimum way to perform a build, re-using all modules that had previously been processed and whose version specifications matched the specifications for the build.

DSEE also introduced the "version spec," which was called a "thread." This was a list of possible versions that could be in the user environment or in a build. A major innovation was the use of build signatures and software release signatures in the thread. The items in a thread might thus be:

- Any copies reserved for editing (i.e. checked out)
- The latest version (usually for developers only)
- A branched version of a file (a version on an alternate line of development).
- A labeled version (for developers working on a particular revision level)
- The version used in build XYZ.
- The version used in software release x.y.z.

Threads were processed from top to bottom for each file. A developer thread might have "reserved" at the top, followed by a labeled version. For a fix to an existing release, the thread would be "reserved", then the release signature.

In the absence of the invisible file redirection of the Apollo Domain file system, ClearCase uses the virtual file system provided by the MVFS feature that is described below. The "thread" concept corresponds to the dynamic view. Support for derived objects in a view is similar to DSEE's concept.

== Releases ==
V11.0.0 (March 2024) release and succeeding fix pack releases.

V10.0.1 (October 2023) release and succeeding fix pack releases.

V10.0.0 (December 2022) and succeeding fix pack releases.

V9.1.0 (December 2020) and succeeding fix pack releases.

V9.0.2 (January 2020) and succeeding fix pack releases.

V9.0.1 (June 2017) and succeeding fix pack releases.

V9.0 (March 2016) and succeeding fix pack releases.

V8.0.1 (June 2013) and succeeding fix pack releases.

V8.0 (October 2011) and succeeding fix pack releases.

== See also ==
- Rational ClearQuest – Defunct software company
- Comparison of version-control software
- List of revision control software
