= Atria Software =

American software company

Atria Software Inc. was a software company that developed ClearCase in the early 1990s. It was founded by David B Leblang, Paul Levine, David Jabs and others on January 11, 1990. Some of the Atria developers had worked on an earlier system: DSEE (Domain Software Engineering Environment) from Apollo Computer. After Hewlett-Packard bought Apollo Computer in 1989, they left to form Atria. Atria later merged with Pure Software to form Pure Atria. That firm merged with Rational Software, which was purchased by IBM in 2003. IBM continues to develop and market ClearCase.
