= MVFS =

The abbreviation MVFS may stand for:

- Marikina Valley Fault System, a geological fault geographically located at the Philippines
- Rational MultiVersion File System, a virtual file system
