= Quantify =

Quantify may refer to:

- Quantification (science), the act or process of quantifying
- in computing: IBM Rational Quantify, a profiling software, part of IBM Rational Purify

Quantify may refer to the measurement of quantity.
