= Visual User Environment =

Desktop interface for Unix workstations

- VUE on HP-UX 9.10
- Developers: Apollo Computer, Hewlett-Packard
- Initial release: March 1992; 34 years ago
- Operating system: Domain/OS, HP-UX
- Type: Desktop environment
- License: Proprietary
- Website: docs.hp.com/en/A2615-90003/index.html "Using Your HP Workstation". Archived from the original on March 15, 2005.

Visual User Environment (VUE or HP VUE) is a discontinued desktop environment developed by Hewlett-Packard, intended for use on Unix workstations. VUE is based on the Motif widget toolkit and targets the X Window System.

VUE is a precursor to Common Desktop Environment (CDE), which was also based on Motif.

== History ==
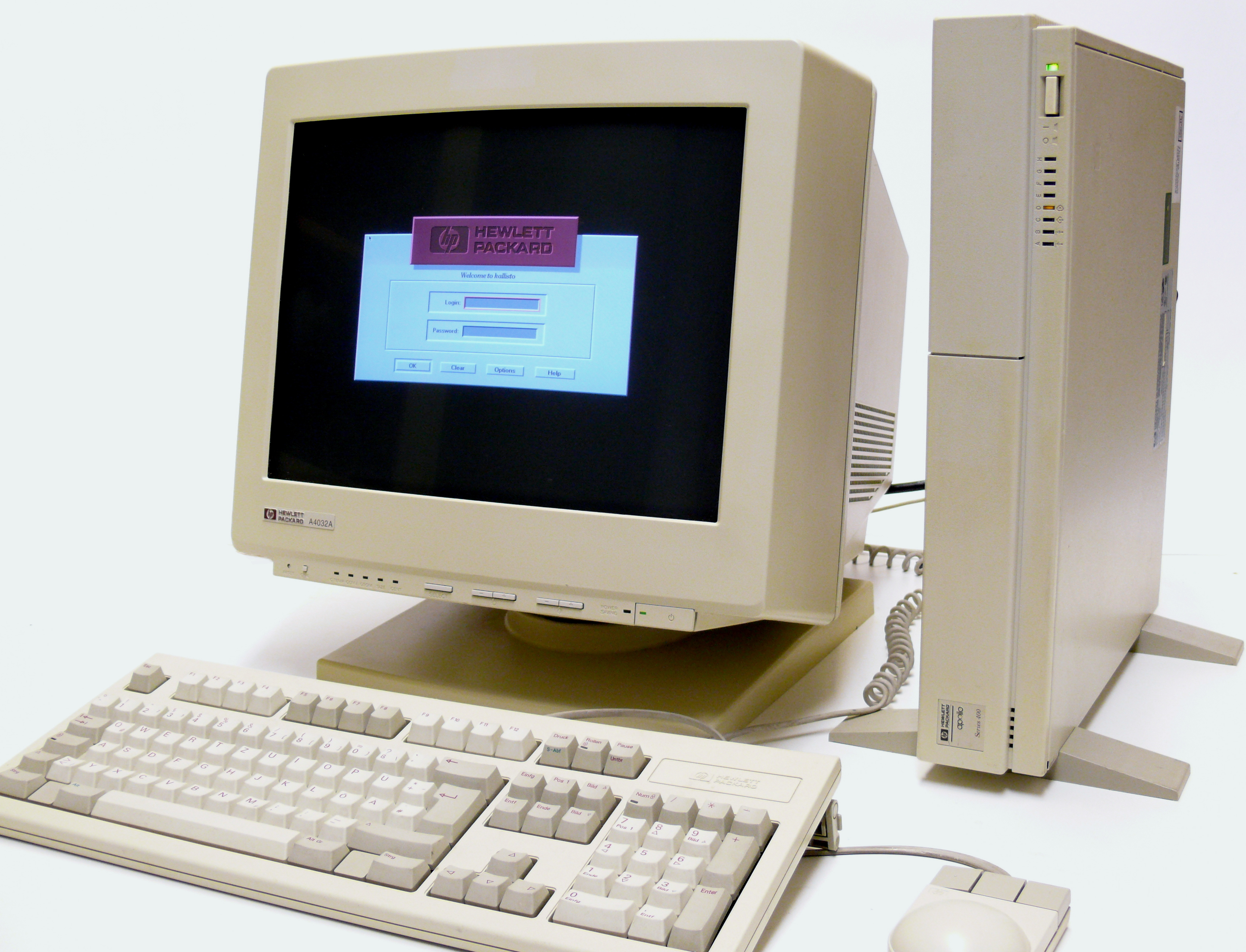
HP 9000 model 425 running the login manager for VUE

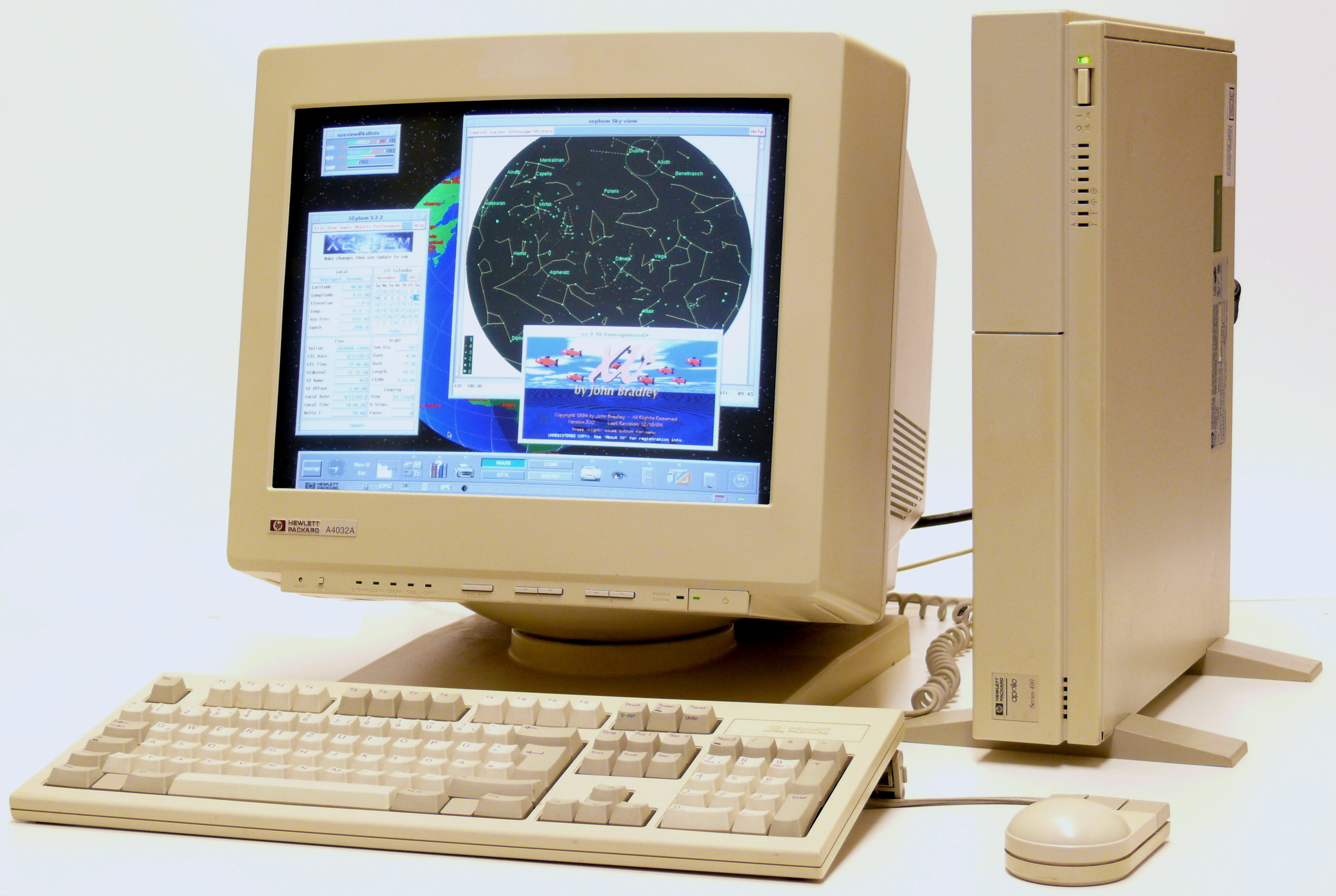
HP 9000 model 425 running VUE on HP-UX 9

Work began on VUE in 1988 at Apollo Computer for use with Domain/OS, as an alternative to Apollo's standard DM and wmgr.

Shortly later, HP acquired Apollo, where they released the first version of VUE for Domain/OS, and then went on to modify VUE for use with HP-UX.

- VUE 1.0 – Released with Domain/OS SR10.4
- VUE 1.1
- VUE 2.0 – Released for HP-UX
- VUE 2.0.1
- VUE 3.0 – Released with HP-UX 9.0 in 1992

According to an article published in the Hewlett-Packard Journal, the look and feel of HP-VUE was used when developing the Common Desktop Environment (CDE):

HP is one of four sponsor companies that contributed key technologies and helped to develop CDE (Common Desktop Environment). CDE's consistent look and feel is based on HP's proven and accepted HP VUE technology.

After its release, HP endorsed CDE as the new standard desktop for Unix, and provided documentation and software for migrating VUE customizations to CDE.

== See also ==
- Motif Window Manager
- Common Desktop Environment
