= Erin Meyer =

American author and academic

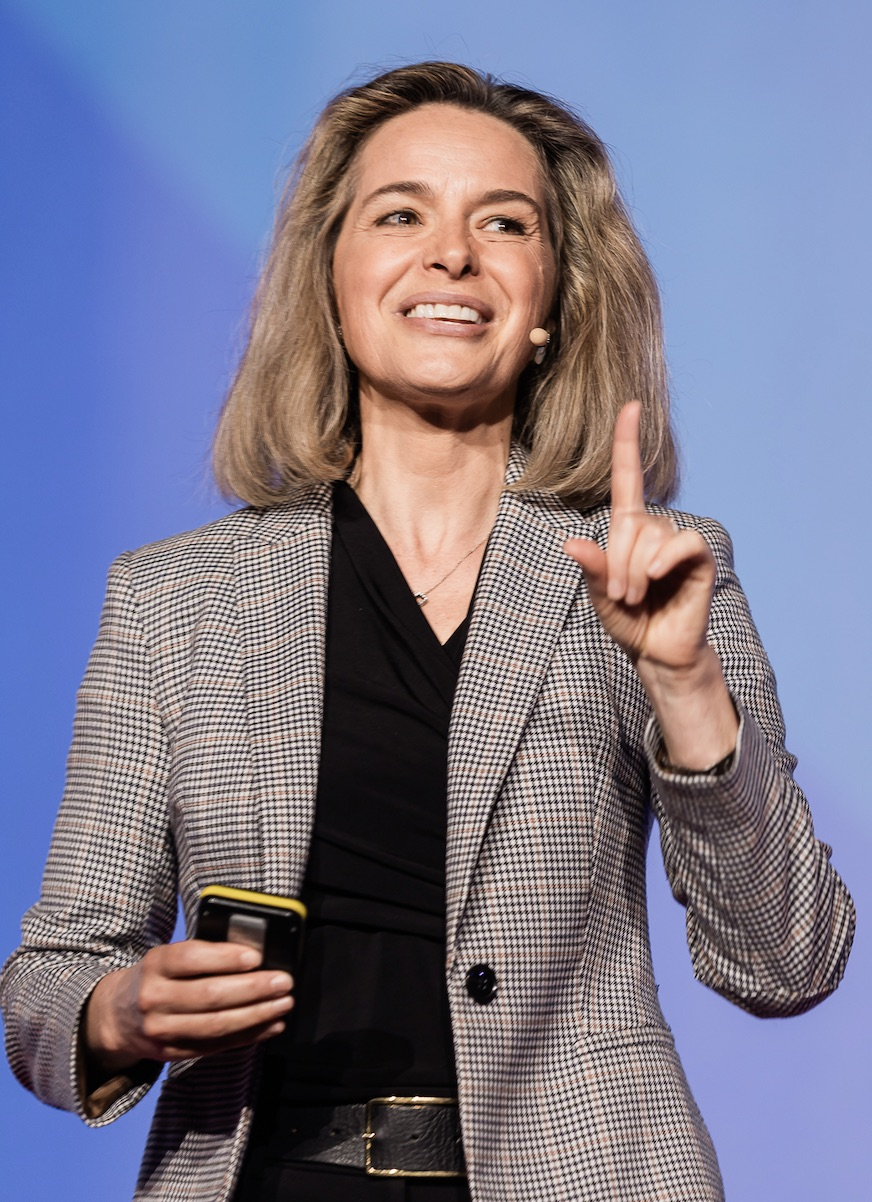
- Born: August 22, 1971 (age 54); Minnesota, United States
- Occupations: Writer, professor
- Notable work: The Culture Map: Breaking Through the Invisible Boundaries of Global Business No Rules Rules: Netflix and the Culture of Reinvention
- Website: erinmeyer.com

Erin Meyer (born August 22, 1971) is an American author and professor at INSEAD Business School, based in Fontainebleau, France. She is most known for writing the 2014 book, The Culture Map: Breaking Through the Invisible Boundaries of Global Business, a study that analyzes how national cultural differences impact business. She is also known for co-authoring the book with Netflix co-founder Reed Hastings, No Rules Rules: Netflix and the Culture of Reinvention, which became a New York Times best seller in October 2020.

Meyer is a professor of management practice in the Organizational Behavior department at INSEAD, an international business school with campuses in France, Singapore and Abu Dhabi. She regularly speaks about cross cultural management and global teamwork.

== Personal life ==
Meyer was born and raised in Minnesota. She has spent most of her adult life in Europe and Africa. Currently, she lives in Paris with her husband and two sons.

== Career ==
Meyer's interest in cross-cultural management dates back to her years as a Peace Corps volunteer, teaching English in Botswana. Later, she worked in HR as a director at McKesson, then at HBOC and Aperian Global. She teaches cross-cultural management at INSEAD, where she is the programme director for the Leading Across Borders and Cultures programme and lectures internationally. She has studied, for nearly two decades, how people in different parts of the world build trust, communicate, make decisions and perceive situations differently, especially in the workplace. She is also a regular contributor to Harvard Business Review.

In 2023, and again in 2025, she was selected by the Thinkers50 as one of the world's most influential business thinkers.

=== The Culture Map: Breaking Through the Invisible Boundaries of Global Business ===
Meyer wrote her first book, The Culture Map: Breaking Through the Invisible Boundaries of Global Business in 2014. This book represents her collective research data from over thirty countries. In the book she provides a framework for evaluating different cultures and then offers strategies for improving international success. She has identified eight dimensions that capture most of the differences within and among cultures. Using this method, Meyer has also developed a self-assessment tool for Harvard Business Review, which helps in seeing where one falls on each of the eight scales.

The book received positive reviews from critics and the media. The Huffington Post wrote that "whether you're a corporate or traditional diplomat, global traveler, government official, or passionate world citizen, this is the one book you should not miss". and Forbes wrote that "The Culture Map stands out as a practical book to explain and frame a very difficult collection of concepts that are increasingly relevant today." In an article about the book, Inc. called it "superb".

=== No Rules Rules: Netflix and the Culture of Reinvention ===
In 2020, Meyer co-authored No Rules Rules: Netflix and the Culture of Reinvention with Netflix co-founder and CEO Reed Hastings. The book examines Netflix’s distinctive management philosophy, emphasizing "freedom and responsibility", radical candor, minimal controls, and high talent density as drivers of innovation and adaptability. Drawing on Hastings’ experiences and more than 200 interviews conducted by Meyer, the book details how Netflix’s unconventional practices shaped its corporate culture and growth.

The book became a New York Times bestseller and was nominated for the 2020 Financial Times and McKinsey Business Book of the Year Awards.

It received positive critical reception. The New York Times wrote that "No Rules Rules demonstrates that it is not only possible to pursue both freedom and responsibility at the same time, but that for Silicon Valley and the rest of us to thrive together, it is essential".

Booklist described it as "informative, thought-provoking, and down-to-earth," while Kirkus Reviews called it a "fascinating story of a counterintuitive approach that apparently works".

Library Journal gave the book a starred review, recommending it "for leaders eager to build innovative, fast, and flexible teams", and Publishers Weekly noted that "aspiring tech moguls should flock to Hastings and Meyer’s energetic and fascinating account".
