= Audrey MacLean =

American businesswoman and entrepreneur (born 1952)

- Born: 1952 (age 73–74); Warwick, New York
- Education: University of Redlands (B.S., Mathematics)
- Occupations: businesswoman, professor

Audrey MacLean (born 1952) is an American businesswoman and entrepreneur. She has been featured on Forbes’ Midas Touch List, Fortune’s Most Powerful Women and Business Week’s Top 50 Business Women in America.

== Early life and career ==
A native of Queens, New York, she attended Long Island University before heading to the West coast and earning a B.S. in mathematics from the University of Redlands. In the summer of 1982, she left Tymshare and co-founded Network Equipment Technologies. Later, she was the founder and CEO of Adaptive Corp., a maker of high-speed switches.

She has provided seed financing to start-ups such as Pure Software, Pete's Brewing Company, AdForce, StarMaker Interactive and Selectica. She continues to invest and serves on the board or advisory board of several other start-ups, including: Aible, Andalou, BeyondCore, Coraid, Finesse, Followanalytics, Loopt, Luxe, mOasis, Queplix, Skybox, SolumTech, and StarMaker. She works with entrepreneurs and is regularly sought for her advice.

MacLean is an advisor to Foundation Capital and serves on the faculty at Stanford University's Graduate School of Engineering. In May 2011, she received the third Symons Innovator Award given annually by NCWIT to honor successful women entrepreneurs in technology.
