= PurifyPlus =

Memory debugger program

UNICOM PurifyPlus
- Original author(s): Pure Software
- Developer(s): UNICOM Systems, a division of UNICOM Global
- Stable release: 8.2 / September 20, 2024
- Operating system: Windows, Linux, Solaris
- Type: Memory debugger
- License: Proprietary software
- Website: www.teamblue.unicomsi.com/products/purifyplus/

PurifyPlus is a memory debugger program used by software developers to detect memory access errors in programs, especially those written in C or C++. It was originally written by Reed Hastings of Pure Software. Pure Software later merged with Atria Software to form Pure Atria Software, which in turn was later acquired by Rational Software, which in turn was acquired by IBM, and then divested to UNICOM Systems, Inc. on Dec 31, 2014. It is functionally similar to other memory debuggers, such as Insure++, Valgrind and BoundsChecker.

== Overview ==
PurifyPlus allows dynamic verification, a process by which a program discovers errors that occur when the program runs, much like a debugger. Static verification or static code analysis, by contrast, involves detecting errors in the source code without ever compiling or running it, just by discovering logical inconsistencies. The type checking by a C compiler is an example of static verification.

When a program is linked with PurifyPlus, corrected verification code is automatically inserted into the executable by parsing and adding to the object code, including libraries. That way, if a memory error occurs, the program will print out the exact location of the error, the memory address involved, and other relevant information. PurifyPlus also detects memory leaks. By default, a leak report is generated at program exit but can also be generated by calling the PurifyPlus leak-detection API from within an instrumented application.

The errors that PurifyPlus discovers include array bounds reads and writes, trying to access unallocated memory, freeing unallocated memory (usually due to freeing the same memory for the second time), as well as memory leaks (allocated memory with no pointer reference). Most of these errors are not fatal (at least not at the site of the error), and often when just running the program there is no way to detect them, except by observing that something is wrong due to incorrect program behavior. Hence PurifyPlus helps by detecting these errors and telling the programmer exactly where they occur. Because PurifyPlus works by instrumenting all the object code, it detects errors that occur inside of third-party or operating system libraries. These errors are often caused by the programmer passing incorrect arguments to the library calls, or by misunderstandings about the protocols for freeing data structures used by the libraries. These are often the most difficult errors to find and fix.

== Differences from traditional debuggers ==
The ability to detect non-fatal errors is a major distinction between PurifyPlus and similar programs from the usual debuggers. By contrast, debuggers generally only allow the programmer to quickly find the sources of fatal errors, such as a program crash due to dereferencing a null pointer, but do not help to detect the non-fatal memory errors. Debuggers are useful for other things that PurifyPlus is not intended for, such as for stepping through the code line by line or examining the program's memory by hand at a particular moment of execution. In other words, these tools can complement each other for a skilled developer.

PurifyPlus also includes other functionality, such as high-performance watchpoints, which are of general use while using a debugger on one's code.

Using PurifyPlus makes the most sense in programming languages that leave memory management to the programmer. Hence, in Java, Lisp, or Visual Basic, for example, automatic memory management reduces occurrence of any memory leaks. These languages can however still have leaks; unnecessary references to objects will prevent the memory from being re-allocated. IBM has a product called Rational Application Developer to uncover these sorts of errors.

== Supported platforms ==
=== Supported C/C++ platforms ===
Operating system	Processor architectures	Operating system versions	Compilers
Solaris
Solaris	Sun UltraSPARC	Solaris 11 base through 11.4; Solaris 10 base through U11	Sun C/C++ 5.10 through 5.15
Solaris	AMD64; Intel 64	Solaris 11 base through 11.4; Solaris 10 U6 through U11	Sun C/C++ 5.10 through 5.15
Linux
Linux	Intel IA-32	RHEL 9 (Server/Desktop) base through 9.4; RHEL 8 (Server/Desktop) base through 8.9; RHEL 7 (Server/Desktop) base through 7.9; SLES 15 base through 15.5; SLES 12 base through 12.5	GNU gcc/g++ 4 through 11
Linux	AMD64; Intel 64	RHEL 9 (Server/Desktop) base through 9.4; RHEL 8 (Server/Desktop) base through 8.9; RHEL 7 (Server/Desktop) base through 7.9; SLES 15 base through 15.5; SLES 12 base through 12.5	GNU gcc/g++ 4 through 11
Windows
Windows	Intel IA-32; Intel 64; AMD 64	Microsoft Windows 10 base through 21H1; Microsoft Windows Server 2019 Standard, Data Center; Microsoft Windows Server 2016 Standard, Data Center; Microsoft Windows Server 2012 Foundation, Essential, Standard, Data Center	Microsoft Visual Studio 2010 through 2022

=== Supported Java/.NET platforms ===
Platform	Data collection type	Runtime environment
Windows
Windows	C/C++ (unmanaged code) data collection	Microsoft Visual Studio 2010 through 2022
Windows	Java code coverage data collection	IBM JRE 5 through 8 SUN JRE 1.5 through 1.8
Windows	.NET (managed code) data collection	.NET Framework 3.0 through 4.5 used with Microsoft Visual Studio 2010 through 2022

== See also ==
- Memory debugger
- Programming tool
- Dynamic memory
- Memory leak
