= Marc Randolph =

American tech entrepreneur and co-founder of Netflix

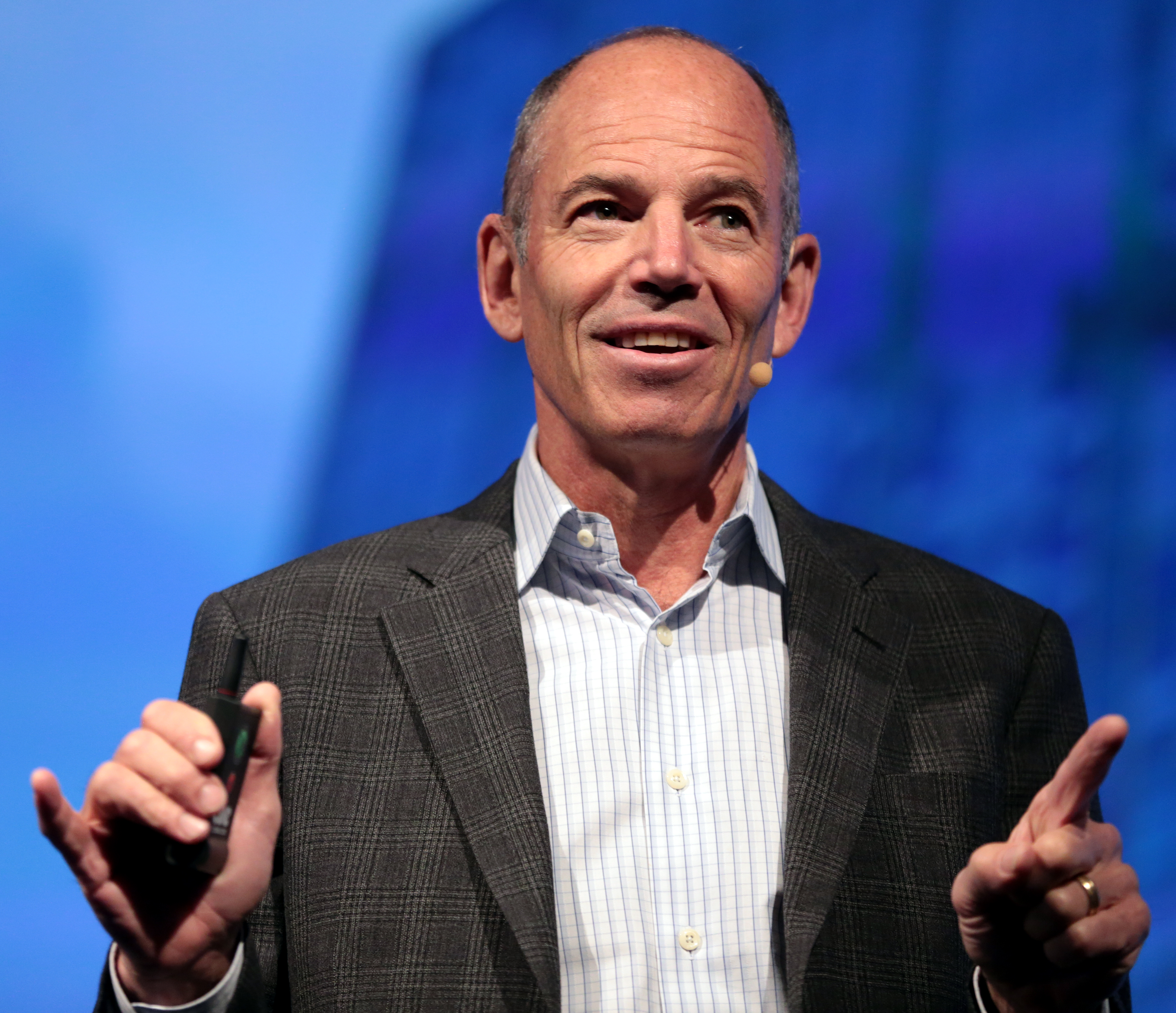
- Randolph in April 2017
- Born: Marc Bernays Randolph; April 29, 1958 (age 68); Chappaqua, New York, U.S.
- Education: Hamilton College (BS)
- Occupations: Co-founder and former CEO of Netflix
- Spouse: Lorraine Kiernan (m. 1987)
- Children: 3
- Family: Bernays family

Marc Bernays Randolph (born April 29, 1958) is an American tech entrepreneur, advisor and speaker. He is the co-founder and first CEO of Netflix.

A serial entrepreneur who is said to have helped found the U.S. edition of Macworld magazine and the computer mail-order businesses MacWarehouse and MicroWarehouse, Randolph now serves on the boards of Looker Data Sciences and Chubbies Shorts. He previously served on the boards of Getable, Rafter, ReadyForce.

Randolph, who has equated founding companies to his experience as a mountain guide, is the chairman of the board of trustees of the National Outdoor Leadership School (NOLS) in Lander, Wyoming and a board member of the environmental advocacy group 1% for the Planet.

== Early life and education ==
Randolph was born to a Jewish family in Chappaqua, New York, the eldest child of Stephen Bernays Randolph, an Austrian-born nuclear engineer turned financial adviser and Muriel Lipchik of Brooklyn, New York, who ran her own real estate firm. One of Randolph's paternal great-grand uncles was psychoanalysis pioneer Sigmund Freud. Another paternal great-uncle of Randolph was Edward Bernays, an Austrian-American pioneer in the field of public relations and propaganda. Randolph spent his summers during high school and college working for the National Outdoor Leadership School, becoming one of its youngest instructors. He graduated from Hamilton College in New York with a geology degree.

== Career ==
=== Early career ===
Randolph's first job out of college in 1981 was at Cherry Lane Music Company in New York. Put in charge of the company's small mail-order operation, Randolph taught himself direct mail and marketing techniques while tinkering with different ways to sell Cherry Lane's catalog of sheet music directly to consumers. Randolph's fascination with using computer software to track customers' buying behavior would ultimately inform his decision to create a user interface at Netflix that doubled as a market research platform. He further developed his theories about using direct mail to influence and retain customers doing circulation work while helping found the U.S. version of MacUser magazine in 1984. While co-founding computer mail-order firms MacWarehouse and MicroWarehouse with Peter Godfrey and his partners about a year later, Randolph made the connection between overnight delivery and improved customer retention. The discovery later proved crucial to Netflix's growth and survival: the company's subscriber base first blossomed and cut into Blockbuster Inc revenues in cities where Netflix offered overnight DVD delivery.

Randolph spent the dawn of the Internet age building direct-to-consumer marketing operations at software giant Borland International starting in 1988. He left Borland in 1995 for a series of short stints at Silicon Valley start-ups, including heading marketing at desktop scanner maker Visioneer, and then as a member of the founding team of Integrity QA, a developer of automated software testing products. In late 1996, software debugging company Pure Atria acquired the nine-person software startup. Pure Atria's founder and CEO Reed Hastings retained Randolph as vice president of corporate marketing for the rapidly expanding Pure Atria. In late 1996, Pure Atria announced that Rational Software would acquire it in an $850 million stock swap in what was then the richest merger in Silicon Valley history. Hastings and Randolph commuted together between their homes in Santa Cruz, California, into Silicon Valley for about four months while the Rational merger was finalized, and on these drives, the idea for Netflix was born.

=== Netflix ===
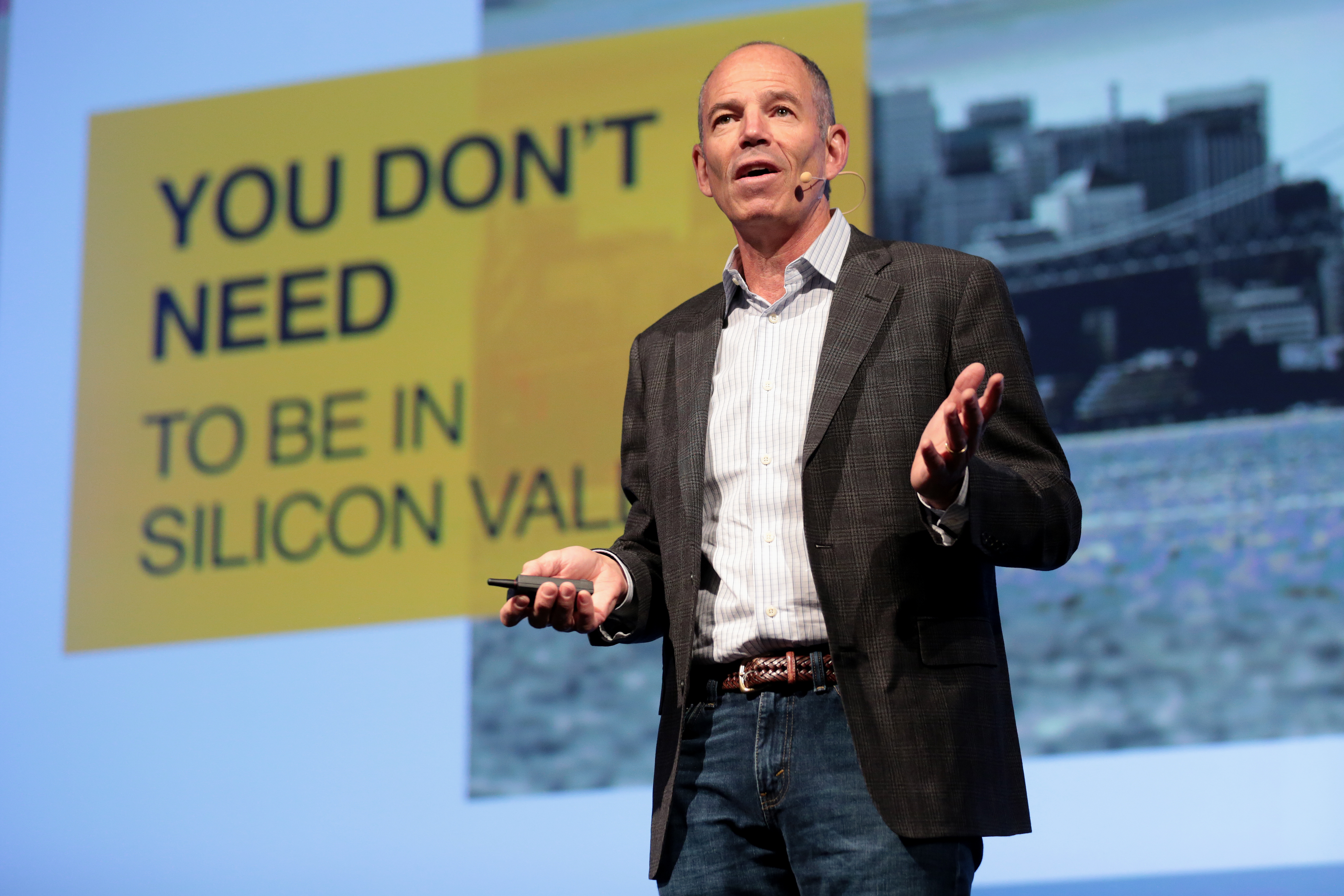
Speaking in Phoenix, Arizona in April 2017.

Randolph wanted to replicate the e-commerce model pioneered by online bookseller Amazon.com. He had heard that digital-versatile-discs (DVD) were being tested in several U.S. markets, and he wanted to explore the concept of selling the compact new digital format online. He and Hastings could not find a DVD, so they tested the idea with a compact disc. "Reed and I were in downtown Santa Cruz and we were saying, 'I wonder if we can mail these things'," Randolph said. "We went in and bought a music CD and went into one of the stationery stores … and bought a greeting card and stuck the CD in the envelope and mailed it to Reed's house. And the next day, he said, 'It came. It's fine.' If there was an aha moment, that was it." Hastings, Randolph's mother, and Integrity QA founder Steve Kahn were initial investors in Netflix when plans first started in 1996-1997. Randolph named the company, designed its initial user interface and branding and acted as chief executive for the first year while Hastings attended Stanford University graduate school. Netflix launched on April 14, 1998, out of an office park in Scotts Valley, California. Randolph designed the user interface to act as an online catalog of movies and a market research platform so that he could constantly test different versions to perfect the user experience. The data generated by these market tests led the team to three concepts that they combined in 1999 to create Netflix's successful business model: a subscription-based service with no due dates or late fees and unlimited access to content, a "Queue" that allowed subscribers to specify the order in which DVDs should be mailed to them, and a serialized delivery system that automatically mailed out a DVD as soon as the previous rental was returned.

The subscriber data collected by the user interface fed a recommendation engine known as Cinematch, that helped manage the company's limited DVD inventory by guiding subscribers to movies and TV shows that were in stock and generally away from new releases.

Randolph ceded the CEO post to Hastings in 1999 and turned to product development. He and founding team member Mitch Lowe tested a concept for a movie rental kiosk called Netflix Express that Lowe later turned into movie kiosk giant Redbox after Hastings rejected it as a line of business. Randolph left Netflix in 2002 after helping guide the company through its initial public offering two years earlier. He credited Hastings with successfully scaling the company to 93 million subscribers worldwide, and said he preferred the start-up stage. "At the beginning, it's very much triage. If there are a hundred things broken and you need the skill to pick the three you've got to fix, I'm really good at that. I'm not good at the other ninety-seven," Randolph said.

=== After Netflix ===
Since his departure from Netflix, Randolph has served as a mentor at MiddCORE and a board member of Looker Data Sciences. He is also Entrepreneur in Residence for High Point University and its Belk Entrepreneurship Center. In addition to his mentorships he is a keynote speaker, focusing on entrepreneurship, leadership, and innovation. He travels the world speaking about his experience with Netflix and the lessons he has learned from his other startup investments.

In September 2019, his book, That Will Never Work: The Birth of Netflix and the Amazing Life of an Idea was published by Little, Brown and Company.

== Personal life ==
Randolph has been married to Lorraine Kiernan since 1987. They have three children. He lives in Santa Cruz, California.

Randolph is the author of the international bestseller That Will Never Work: The Birth of Netflix and the Amazing Life of an Idea (2019) and hosts a podcast of the same name. He serves as Entrepreneur in Residence for High Point University and its Belk Entrepreneurship Center.
