= Apollo Computer =

American computer manufacturer (1980–1989)

Apollo Computer Inc.
- Industry: Apollo/Domain workstations
- Founded: 1980; 46 years ago
- Founder: William Poduska
- Fate: Acquired by Hewlett-Packard in 1989
- Headquarters: Chelmsford, Massachusetts

Apollo Computer Inc. was an American technology corporation headquartered and founded in Chelmsford, Massachusetts. It was founded in 1980 by William Poduska (a founder of Prime Computer) and others. Apollo Computer developed and produced Apollo/Domain workstations in the 1980s. Along with Symbolics and Sun Microsystems, Apollo was one of the first vendors of graphical workstations. Like other computer companies at the time, Apollo produced much of its own hardware and software.

Apollo was acquired by Hewlett-Packard in 1989 for US$476 million (equivalent to $1.236 billion in 2025), and gradually closed down over the period of 1990–1997. The brand (as "HP Apollo") was resurrected in 2014 as part of HP's high-performance computing portfolio.

== History ==
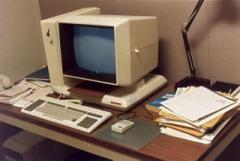
Apollo dn330 at Chelmsford, MA, c. 1985

Apollo was started in 1980, two years before rival Sun Microsystems. In addition to Poduska, the founders included Dave Nelson (engineering), Mike Greata (engineering), Charlie Spector (COO), Bob Antonuccio (manufacturing), Gerry Stanley (sales and marketing), and Dave Lubrano (finance). The founding engineering team included Mike Sporer, Bernie Stumpf, Russ Barbour, Paul Leach, and Andy Marcuvitz.

Apollo was the first to release a standalone workstation. In 1981, the company unveiled the DN100 workstation, which used the Motorola 68000 microprocessor. Apollo workstations ran Aegis (later replaced by Domain/OS), a proprietary operating system with a Unix alternative shell. Apollo's networking was particularly elegant, among the first to allow demand paging over the network, and allowing a degree of network transparency and low sysadmin-to-machine ratio.

From 1980 to 1987, Apollo was the largest manufacturer of network workstations. Its quarterly sales exceeded $100 million for the first time in late 1986, and by the end of that year, it had the largest worldwide share of the engineering workstations market, at twice the market share of the number two, Sun Microsystems. At the end of 1987, it was third in market share after Digital Equipment Corporation and Sun, but ahead of Hewlett-Packard and IBM. Apollo's largest customers were Mentor Graphics (electronic design), General Motors, Ford, Chrysler, Chicago Research and Trading (Options and Futures) and Boeing.

Apollo was acquired by Hewlett-Packard in 1989 for US$476 million, and gradually closed down over the period 1990–1997. But after acquiring Apollo Computer in 1989, HP integrated a lot of Apollo technology into their own HP 9000 series of workstations and servers. The Apollo engineering center took over PA-RISC workstation development and Apollo became an HP workstation brand name (HP Apollo 9000) for a while. Apollo also invented the revision control system DSEE (Domain Software Engineering Environment) which inspired IBM IBM DevOps Code ClearCase. DSEE was pronounced "dizzy".

Aegis, like Unix, was based on concepts from the Multics time-sharing operating system. It used the concepts of shell programming (à la Stephen Bourne), single-level store, and object-oriented design. Aegis was written in a proprietary version of Pascal.

The dual 68000 processor configuration was designed to provide automatic page fault switching, with the main processor executing the OS and program instructions, and the "fixer" processor satisfying the page faults. When a page fault was raised, the main CPU was halted in mid (memory) cycle while the fixer CPU would bring the page into memory and then allow the main CPU to continue, unaware of the page fault. Later improvements in the Motorola 68010 processor obviated the need for the dual-processor design.

Certain efficiencies were gained by careful design; for example, the memory page size, network packet, and disk sector were all 1K byte in size. With this arrangement, a page fault could take place across the network as well as on the individual computer and Aegis file system was a single system of memory mapped files across the entire network. The namespace of the network was self discovering as new nodes (workstations) were added.

Domain/OS (Distributed On-line Multi-access Interactive Network/Operating System) was initially a layer over Aegis and was not built on a Unix kernel. Release 10 incorporated large parts of Unix but the burden of backwards compatibility with previous releases led to a system that was larger and significantly slower than the previous ones. In the end, Hewlett Packard shut down the Domain/OS line. Release 10 came out as competitors were gaining ground in the area of graphics and windowing systems, particularly with the trend to open systems and the X Window System.

Another feature was its proprietary token ring network, which was originally designed to support relatively small networks of, at most, dozens of computers in an office environment. It was a superb design, allowing direct memory access page faulting from any hard drive on the network, but it did not inter-operate with any other existing network hardware or software. The industry widely adopted Ethernet and TCP/IP, a more universal, albeit much slower network. Apollo later added support for these industry standards while continuing to support its own Domain networking using both Ethernet and token ring. The Domain network routing was modeled after Xerox Network Systems.

The company moved from a proprietary data bus architecture in favor of IBM's AT-bus, as used in the second generation of IBM PCs, and was simultaneously embracing RISC technology moving towards high-end processors, eventually producing the PRISM line.

The workstation industry in general experienced hard times in the second half of the 1980s, as IBM Personal Computers and IBM PC compatibles began making inroads on their customer base.

Thomas Vanderslice was hired as President and CEO in 1984, and founder William Poduska left the company in 1985 to found Stellar.

The company incurred large losses in 1987 in currency speculation due to the trading activities of one individual, and in 1988 from declining demand for its products. In 1989, Apollo was acquired by Hewlett-Packard for US$476 million (equivalent to $1236 million in 2025). HP support for Apollo products was fragmented for the first few years, but was reorganized in late 1992, at which point there were still some 100,000 users of Apollo products and the user group InterWorks had some 4,500 members. Earlier that year, Sun had already offered discounts on its systems for customers trading in their Apollo machines; HP responded the next winter with a trade-in program of its own, that also allowed trading in hardware from Sun and other vendors in return for a discount on HP workstations.

Apollo was gradually closed down over the period of 1990–1997.

== Models ==
Apollo Computer models
System Type	Model	CPU	Speed (MHz)	Display	Release date	Internal name
SAU1	DN416	2× 68000	8	Portrait black & green		
SAU1	DN100	2× 68000	8	Portrait BW		
SAU1	DN400	2× 68000	8	Portrait BW		
SAU1	DN600	2× 68000	8	Color		
SAU1	DN420	2× 68000	8	Landscape BW		
SAU2	DN300	68010	8	Landscape BW		Swallow
SAU2	DN320	68010	8	Landscape BW		Swallow
SAU2	DN330	68020	12	Landscape BW		Swallow
SAU3	DSP80, DSP80A	68010	8	none		Sparrow
SAU3	DSP90	68020	12	none		Sparrow
SAU4	DN460	Custom 2900 bit slice	?	BW		Tern
SAU4	DN660	Custom 2900 bit slice	?	Color		Tern
SAU4	DSP160	Custom 2900 bit slice	?	none		Tern
SAU5	DN550	68010	10	VME 600 Graphics		Stingray
SAU5	DN560	68020	12	VME 600 Graphics		Stingray
SAU5	DN570	68020	16	Ocelot Graphics Single Card 8 plane		Banshee
SAU5	DN580	68020	16	Aurora Graphics		Banshee
SAU5	DN590	68020	20	Aurora Graphics		Banshee
SAU6	DN560T	68020	12	Color		Banshee
SAU6	DN570T	68020	16	Color		Banshee
SAU6	DN580T	68020	16	Color		Banshee
SAU6	DN590T	68020	20	Color		Banshee
SAU7	DN3500	68030	25	BW / Color		Cougar II
SAU7	DN3550	68030	25	BW / Color		
SAU7	DN4000	68020	25	BW / Color		Mink
SAU7	DN4500	68030	33	BW / Color		Roadrunner
SAU8	DN3000	68020	12	BW / Color		Otter
SAU8	DN3010, DN3010A	68020	12	BW / Color		
SAU8	DN3040	68020	12	BW / Color		
SAU9	DN2500	68030	20	BW / Color		Frodo
SAU10	DN10000	PRISM	18	BW / Color		AT
SAU11	9000/425S	68040	25			Trailways
SAU11	9000/425T	68040	25	HP DIOII		Strider
SAU11	9000/425E	68040	25			Woody
SAU11	9000/433S	68040	33			Trailways
SAU11	9000/433T	68040	33			
SAU12	9000/400S	68030	50			Trailways
SAU12	9000/400T	68030	50			Strider
SAU12	9000/400DL	68030	50			
SAU14	DN5500	68040	25	BW / Color		Leopard

== See also ==
- Apollo/Domain
- Apollo PRISM
- Atria Software
- Domain/OS
