= Reed Hastings =

American entrepreneur and education philanthropist (born 1960)

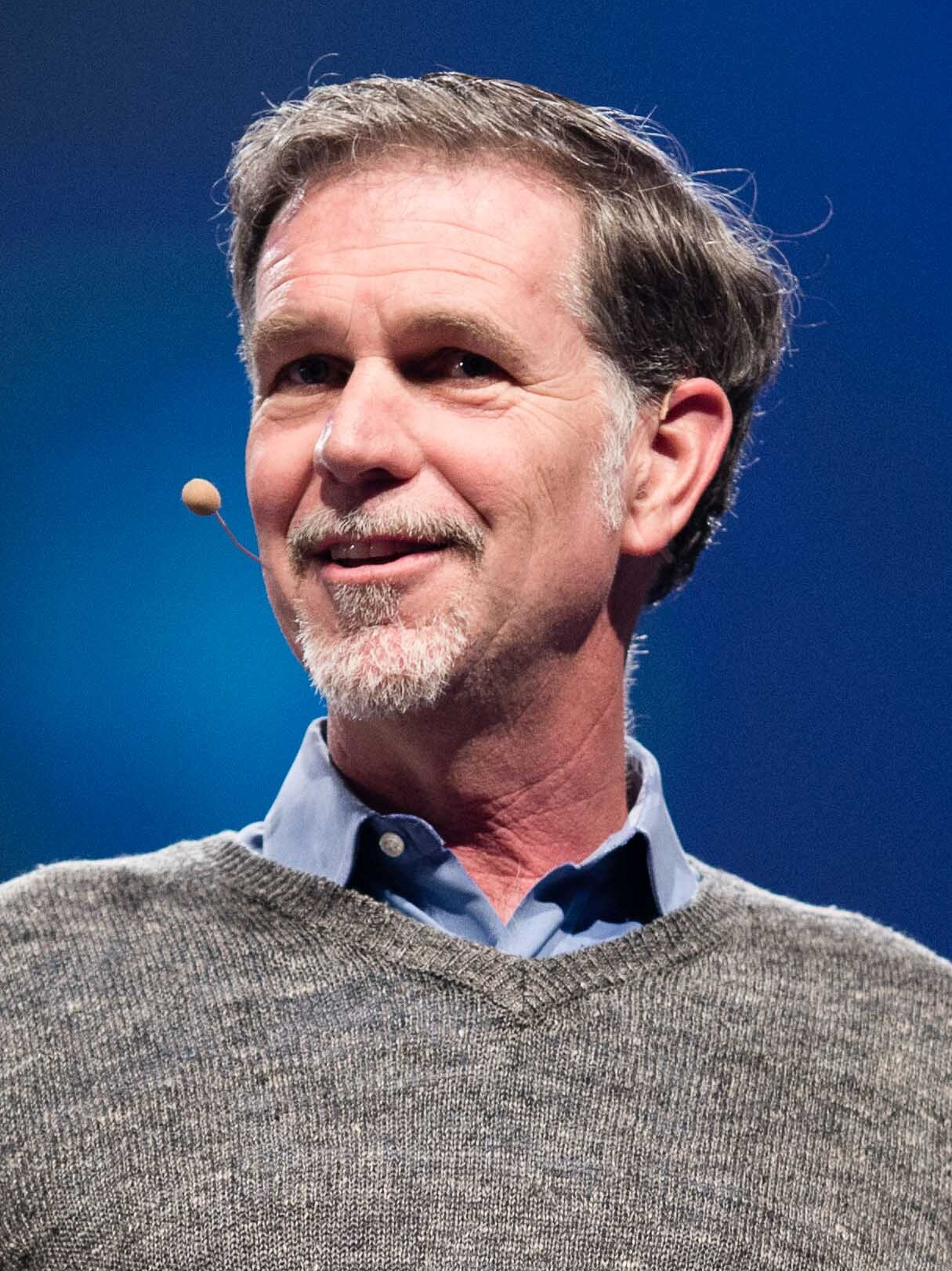
- Hastings in 2015
- Born: Wilmot Reed Hastings Jr. October 8, 1960 (age 66); Boston, Massachusetts, U.S.
- Education: Bowdoin College (BA); Stanford University (MS)
- Known for: Co-founding of Netflix
- Title: Chairman of Netflix (2023–2026); CEO of Netflix (1999–2023)
- Spouse: Patricia Ann Quillin (m. 1991)
- Children: 2
- Website: www.netflix.com

Wilmot Reed Hastings Jr. (born October 8, 1960) is an American billionaire businessman. He is the co-founder of Netflix, which provides the eponymous streaming service. Hastings serves on a number of boards and works with various non-profit organizations. A former president of the California State Board of Education, Hastings is also an advocate for charter schools.

As of May 2025, Forbes estimated Hastings's net worth at US $6.6 billion.

== Early life ==
Hastings was born in Boston, Massachusetts. His father, Wilmot Reed Hastings Sr., was an attorney for the Department of Health, Education and Welfare in the Nixon administration, and his mother, Joan Amory Loomis, was a debutante from a Boston Brahmin family who was repulsed by the world of high society and taught her children to disdain it. His maternal great-grandfather was Alfred Lee Loomis.

Hastings attended Buckingham Browne & Nichols School in Cambridge, Massachusetts, and sold vacuum cleaners door-to-door in a gap year before entering college. In 1983, he graduated from Bowdoin College with a Bachelor of Arts in mathematics. Hastings found Bowdoin "beautiful and engaging," and still remains engaged with the school.

He joined Marine Corps officer training through their Platoon Leader Class, and spent college summers in the Marines, including a stint at the Officer Candidate School boot camp at Marine Corps Base Quantico, Virginia in the summer of 1981. He did not complete the training and never commissioned into the Marine Corps, choosing instead to pursue service in the Peace Corps "out of a combination of service and adventure". With the Peace Corps, he taught math at a high school of around 800 students in rural northwest Swaziland from 1983 to 1985. He credits part of his entrepreneurial spirit to his time there, remarking that, "Once you have hitchhiked across Africa with ten bucks in your pocket, starting a business doesn't seem too intimidating."

After returning from the Peace Corps, Hastings went on to attend Stanford University after being rejected from his first choice of MIT, graduating in 1988 with a Master of Science in Computer Science.

== Career ==
=== Founding of Pure Software ===
Hastings' first job was at Adaptive Technology, where he created a tool for debugging software. He met Audrey MacLean in 1990 when she was CEO at Adaptive Corp. In 2007, Hastings told CNN: "From her, I learned the value of focus. I learned it is better to do one product well than two products in a mediocre way."

Hastings left Adaptive Technology in 1991 to lay the foundation for his first company, Pure Software, which produced products to troubleshoot software. The company's growth proved challenging for Hastings, as he lacked managerial experience. He stated that he had trouble managing with a rapid headcount growth. His engineering background didn't prepare him for the challenges of being a CEO, and he asked his board to replace him, stating that he was losing confidence.

In 1996, Pure Software announced a merger with Atria Software. The merger integrated Pure Software's programs for detecting bugs in software with Atria's tools to manage development of complex software. The Wall Street Journal reported that there were problems integrating the sales forces of the two companies after both head salesmen left following the merger.

In 1997, the combined company, Pure Atria, was acquired by Rational Software, which triggered a 42% drop in both companies' stocks after the deal was announced. Hastings was appointed Chief Technical Officer of the combined companies and left soon after the acquisition.

=== Founder of Netflix ===
In 1997, Reed Hastings co-founded Netflix, offering flat rate movie rental-by-mail to customers in the US.

In 1997, Hastings and former Pure Software employee Marc Randolph co-founded Netflix, Inc., offering flat rate movie rental by mail to customers in the US, combining two emerging technologies: DVDs, which were much easier to send as mail than VHS cassettes; and a website from which to order them, rather than a paper catalogue. Headquartered in Los Gatos, California, Netflix has since amassed a collection of 100,000 titles and more than 100 million subscribers. Hastings had the idea for Netflix after he left Pure Software. "I had a big late fee for Apollo 13. It was six weeks late and I owed the video store $40. I had misplaced the cassette. It was all my fault. I didn't want to tell my wife about it. And I said to myself, "I'm going to compromise the integrity of my marriage over a late fee?" Later, on my way to the gym, I realized they had a much better business model. You could pay $30 or $40 a month and work out as little or as much as you wanted." (Randolph later said that Hastings had invented the anecdote to explain Netflix's subscription business model; Blockbuster reportedly demanded that Hastings stop telling the story, after being unable to find the transaction in its records.)

Hastings said that when he founded Netflix, he had no idea whether customers would use the service. He is a proponent of Internet television and sees it as the future. He credits YouTube for his shift in strategy to developing a video streaming service. Netflix launched a service in 2007 to stream movies and television shows to computers.

In April 2026, it was announced that Hastings will step down from the board of Netflix in June that year.

==== Netflix culture ====
As Netflix grew, the company was noticed for its innovative management practices—the results of the culture Hastings was exploring—called "Freedom and Responsibility". Netflix reportedly offers mediocre employees large severance packages to ensure that employees are consistently working to further the company's innovative environment. Netflix has eliminated sick and vacation time for employees, and instead allows them to manage their time off individually.

Hastings created an internal culture guide for Netflix by meeting with employees to discuss the company's culture. In August 2009, Hastings posted this internal culture guide publicly online, and it eventually became a pre-employment screening tool that dissuaded incompatible people from applying.

In September 2020, Hastings and Erin Meyer co-authored a book on Netflix's culture and management principles with interviews from current and former employees. No Rules Rules: Netflix and the Culture of Reinvention was a New York Times bestseller, featured on year-end lists for publications such as NPR and The Economist. It was shortlisted for the Financial Times and McKinsey Business Book of the Year Award.

=== Other business ventures ===
Hastings was on the board of Microsoft from 2007 to 2012. He was also on the board of directors of Facebook from June 2011 to May 2019. As of September 2016, Hastings was reported to own over $10 million of Facebook shares.

Hastings is the majority owner of the Powder Mountain ski resort in Utah following his $100 million investment in 2023. That same year, he announced plans to turn half of the mountain into a members-only ski club, in addition to other planned residential developments.

Hastings was appointed to the board of directors of Bloomberg in 2023. In 2025, he was added to the board of Anthropic.

Reed Hastings invested in SunCulture, a Nairobi, Kenya-based startup that supplies solar-powered water pumps to smallholder farmers.

== Activism and philanthropy ==
=== Education ===
==== California State Board of Education ====
After selling Pure Software, Hastings found himself without a goal. He became interested in educational reform in California and enrolled in the Stanford Graduate School of Education. In 2000, Governor Gray Davis appointed Hastings to the State Board of Education, and in 2001, Hastings became its president. He spent $1 million of his own money together with $6 million from Silicon Valley venture capitalist John Doerr to promote the passage of Proposition 39 in November 2000, a measure that lowered the threshold of voter approval for local schools to pass construction bond measures from 66 to 55 percent.

In 2009, Hastings ran into trouble on the State Board of Education when Democratic legislators challenged his advocacy of more English instruction and language testing for non-English speaking students. The California Senate Rules Committee refused to confirm him as the board's president. The California State Legislature rejected him in January 2005. Governor Arnold Schwarzenegger, who had reappointed Hastings to the board after Hastings' first term, issued a statement saying he was "disappointed" in the committee's action. Hastings resigned.

In April 2008, Steven Maviglio reported that Hastings had made a $100,000 contribution to California Governor Schwarzenegger's "Voters First" redistricting campaign.

==== Charter schools ====
Hastings is active in educational philanthropy and politics. One of the issues he most strongly advocates is charter schools, publicly funded, privately run elementary or secondary schools.

In July 2006, the Santa Cruz Sentinel reported that Hastings had donated $1 million to Beacon Education Network to open up new charter schools in Santa Cruz County, where he lives.

Hastings, as a Giving Pledge member since 2012, founded Hastings Fund and pledged $100 million to children's education. In his post on Facebook, he said that the Hastings Fund "will donate these funds in the best way possible for kids' education." Hastings Fund gave its first two gifts, totaling $1.5 million, to the United Negro College Fund and the Hispanic Foundation of Silicon Valley for college scholarships for black and Latino youth.

In March 2014, he argued for the elimination of elected school boards.

==== Historically Black Colleges and Universities (HBCUs) ====
In June 2020, Hastings donated $120 million to be equally split among the United Negro College Fund, Morehouse College and Spelman College. It was the largest individual donation ever to support scholarships at HBCUs.

==== Bowdoin College donations ====
In March 2025, Bowdoin College announced that Hastings had given $50 million to create the Hastings Initiative for AI and Humanity. The gift is the largest to date in the school's history.

=== Donor-advised fund ===
Hastings opened a donor-advised fund at the Silicon Valley Community Foundation in 2016 with a $100 million contribution. In 2024, he gifted two million of his Netflix shares worth $1.1 billion to the foundation.

=== Technology ===
In April 2004, Hastings authored a Wall Street Journal op-ed advocating the expensing of stock options.

=== Politics ===
In August 2007, the Los Angeles Times reported that Hastings had donated $1 million to a committee formed to support California State Superintendent of Schools Jack O'Connell's candidacy for Governor of California in 2010.

In April 2009, Hastings donated $251,491.03 to Budget Reform Now, a coalition supporting California Propositions 1A to 1F.

Hastings supported Hillary Clinton in the 2016 US presidential election.

In 2021, Hastings gave $3 million to defeat the campaign to recall Gavin Newsom as governor of California.

On July 3, 2024, Hastings called on Joe Biden to withdraw from the 2024 United States presidential election. On July 23, 2024, Hastings supported Kamala Harris for the presidential election and made a multimillion-dollar donation to Republican Accountability PAC, a Super PAC supporting her campaign. It was his largest donation in support of a single candidate.

In March 2025, Hastings donated $2 million to support Ukraine in the Russo-Ukrainian War.

In the 2025 New York City mayoral elections, Reed Hastings donated $250,000 to unsuccessfully stop Zohran Mamdani from being elected mayor of New York City.

== Personal life ==
Hastings lives in Santa Cruz, California. He is married to Patricia Ann Quillin and has two children.

In 2020, Hastings and his wife donated $120 million to Morehouse College and Spelman College in Atlanta, Georgia. That same year, they donated $30 million to GAVI to support the COVAX COVID-19 vaccines initiative.

In January 2024, Hastings donated approximately $1.1 billion worth of Netflix stock to the Silicon Valley Community Foundation. In March 2025, he donated $50 million to Bowdoin College, his alma mater, to establish the Hastings Initiative for AI and Humanity.
