= Domain/OS =

Discontinued operating system

- Domain/OS 10.4, showing a Display Manager (DM) session
- Developer: Apollo Computer, Hewlett-Packard
- Written in: Pascal
- OS family: Multics-like and Unix-like
- Working state: Historic
- Initial release: March 27, 1981; 45 years ago (Aegis SR1)
- Latest release: Domain/OS SR10.4.1.2 / March 1992 (for SR10.4)
- Available in: English
- Supported platforms: Apollo/Domain workstations
- Kernel type: AEGIS: Monolithic; Domain/OS: Microkernel
- Userland: AEGIS, BSD, System V
- Default user interface: DM windowing system, CLI

Domain/OS is the discontinued operating system used by the Apollo/Domain line of workstations manufactured by Apollo Computer. It was originally launched in 1981 as AEGIS, and was rebranded to Domain/OS in 1988 when Unix environments were added to the operating system. It is one of the early distributed operating systems. Hewlett-Packard supported the operating system for a short time after they purchased Apollo, but they later ended the product line in favor of HP-UX. HP ended final support for Domain/OS on January 1, 2001.

== AEGIS ==
AEGIS is distinctive mainly for being designed for the networked computer, as distinct from its competitors, which are essentially standalone systems with added network features. The prime examples of this are the file system, which is fully integrated across machines, as opposed to Unix which draws a distinction between file systems on the host system and on others, and the user administration system, which is fundamentally network-based. So basic is this orientation that even a standalone Apollo machine cannot be configured without a network card.

Domain/OS SR10 provided three selectable environments: AEGIS, System V, and BSD Unix. The BSD and System V environments supplied their respective command sets and programming interfaces while retaining Domain/OS services. Apollo's manuals documented both standard Unix file permissions and Domain/OS access-control lists for the BSD environment. SR10 also included the X Window System and VUE, HP's predecessor to the Common Desktop Environment.

User upgrading from AEGIS SR9 to Domain/OS SR10 was slowed by the fact that many users saw no requirement, by increased disk space requirements, by new and more complex administration tools, by SR10's poorer performance, and by the buggy nature of SR10.0, although later versions are more reliable. However, later HP/Apollo machines (the DN10000, DN2500 and 4xx series workstations) can only run SR10.

Unlike many operating systems of the day, which were written in C or assembly language, many Domain/OS components are written in Pascal. Compilers for users are available for C, C++, Pascal, and Fortran.

Distributed services in Domain/OS used Apollo's Network Computing System (NCS). NCS supplied a transport-independent remote procedure call facility, an interface definition language, and location brokers for finding services. Apollo's design documentation described implementations for Domain/OS, BSD, System V, and SunOS, and stated that the underlying Network Computing Architecture had been placed in the public domain.

=== User interface ===
AEGIS is similar to other workstations of the time, in that it uses a high-resolution graphics screen and mouse to provide a GUI named DM (Display Manager). DM is integrated with the operating system's own window manager known as wmgr (Window Manager). The DM contains two built-in functions, a text editor and a transcript, which is a kind of virtual terminal. Additional functions can be added by user programs. One of the unique features of the DM is "universal editing". All text in any of the built-in windows can be edited using the same editing language. This includes the history displayed in a transcript window, although that text is read-only. In addition, the history is unbounded. It starts from the birth of the process to which it is attached, and older history is never deleted. Each transcript is attached to a mini-input window where the process input can be edited using the same editing language used elsewhere.

The AEGIS command interface is similar to Unix, in that it has a command line interpreter which understands pipes, redirection, scripting, etc., and invokes other commands as separate programs, but the actual commands themselves are designed to be easier to remember and use than their Unix equivalents, and wildcards are expected to be expanded by individual commands rather than by the command line interpreter itself. The user may embed environment variables in symbolic links, which, for example, allows switching between different versions of Unix by setting the SYSTYPE environment variable accordingly; symbolic links then point to the appropriate versions of the files.

== History ==
Domain/OS incorporates several ideas from Multics, including single-level store and dynamic linking.

HP promised support for Domain/OS until 2000, although with only minor changes and fixes to version 10.4.

System releases
Release	Date
1.0	March, 1981
1.1	April, 1981
2.0	July, 1981
2.1	August, 1981
2.2	September, 1981
3.0	November, 1981
3.1	January, 1982
4.0	April, 1982
6.0	May, 1983
7.0	October, 1983
8.0	April, 1984
8.1	February, 1985
9.2	February, 1986
9.2.3	April, 1986
9.2.5	May, 1986
9.5	January, 1987
9.7	November, 1987
10.1	December, 1988
10.2	November, 1989
10.3	August, 1990
10.4	March, 1992

== See also ==
- Timeline of operating systems
