= Apollo/Domain =

Series of workstation computers

Apollo/Domain is a series of workstations that were developed and produced by Apollo Computer from c. 1980 to 1989. The machines were built around the Motorola 68k series of processors, except for the DN10000, which has from one to four of Apollo's RISC processors, named PRISM.

== Operating system ==
The original operating system is Apollo's own product called Aegis, which was later renamed to Domain/OS. The Aegis and Domain/OS system offers advanced features for the time, for example an object oriented filesystem, network transparency, diskless booting, a graphical user interface, and, in Domain/OS, interoperability with BSD, System V, and POSIX.

== Hardware ==
An Apollo workstation resembles a modern PC, with a base unit, keyboard, mouse, and screen. Early models are housed in short (about 2 feet high) 19" rack cabinets to be set beside a desk or under a table. The DN300 and later DN330 were designed as integrated units with the system and monitor in one unit. These models fit easily on a desk.

Every Apollo system (even standalone) includes at least one network interface. The only original option is the 12 Mbit/s Apollo Token Ring (ATR), and then 10 Mbit/s Ethernet was added as an option. It has been stated that the IBM Token Ring was an option but this was never available. The ATR is generally the best choice, because it is extremely scalable; the Ethernet of the time has serious performance loss as extra machines are added to the network, but this is not true of ATR, which can easily have over 100 machines on one network. One drawback is that, unlike Ethernet, one machine failure (which could easily happen with a single faulty connector) stops the entire network. For this reason, Apollo provided an optional, but strongly recommended, network cabling system of bypass switches and quick connect boxes which allow machines to be disconnected and moved without problems. Apollo Token Ring networks use 75 ohm RG-6U coaxial cabling.

== Networking ==
The network orientation of the systems, together with the ATR functionality, enables easy and practicable booting to diskless machines using another machine's OS. In principle, as many machines can be booted from one host as it can cope with; in practice, four diskless machines from one host is about the limit. Provided the correct machine-specific software is installed on the host (again, very easy), any type of machine could be booted from any other. One complication is that a DN10000 can only be booted from another DN10000 or a 68K-based system which has "cmpexe" compound executables installed.

Some systems can have the graphics card removed for use as servers and the keyboard and mouse are automatically ignored, and the system is accessed either across the network, or via a dumb terminal plugged into the machine's serial port. Such a system is designated "DSP" instead of "DN".

== Models ==
The model naming convention is DN (for Domain Node) with a model number. If the system has no display, it is a DSP (for Domain Service Processor).

The first model is the DN416 workstation, later referred to as the DN100 after the green screen was substituted with a black and white screen. This system uses two 68000 processors and implements virtual memory (which the 68000 is not theoretically capable of) by stopping one processor when there is a page fault and having the other processor handle the fault, then release the primary processor when the page fault was handled.

Later models have 68010, 68020, 68030, and 68040 processors which have native support for virtual memory. Some workstations have bit-slice CPU implementations that are instruction set compatible with the 68000.

The DSP90 is a fileserver built using a standard Multibus backplane and I/O controllers. The disk controller supports up to four 500MB hard drives. A 9-track tape controller was released.

Early performance models are the DN560 and DN660 which are housed in desk-side cabinets. These can have color graphics cards with graphics accelerators.

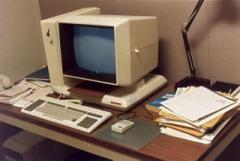
Apollo DN330 at Chelmsford, c. 1985

The DN300 and later DN330 are integrated desktop systems not much bigger than the included monitor.

In the late 1980s, Apollo introduced a new pair of machines, the DN3000 and DN4000 with 68020 processors, but are housed in IBM PC style cases of the time with IBM-AT compatible ISA expansion slots and PC-compatible disk drives. These became the mainstay of the Apollo range in the mid to late 1980s. In principle, a user or third party can install a standard AT expansion card, but since this requires writing a special device driver, in practice this is very rare. However, the size and design of the boxes make installing or replacing components very easy. A typical system can have between 2 MiB and 32 MiB of memory, a 76 MB, 150 MB or 330 MB (very occasionally 660 MB) hard disk, and 32-bit 68020 or 68030 processor running at 12 MHz to 33 MHz, depending on model. A half-height expansion bay could take either a 5¼-inch floppy disk drive or a QIC-type cartridge tape drive, capacity 30 MB, 45 MB, or 60 MB depending on cartridge. For printer access, the system came with a serial port as standard; a serial/parallel expansion card can provide a parallel printer port.

The DN3000 and DN4000 were later upgraded to DN3500 and DN4500 with a faster 68030 CPU. The DN3500 is approximately as powerful as the DN4000. A DN5500 with a 68040 was also produced in limited quantities.

The DN10000 series used Apollo PRISM processors.

Soon after HP acquired Apollo, the base DN2500 workstation was released at $3,900, advertised as "4 Mips, 4 MB of memory, for under $4,000". It features a single integrated motherboard using PC standard DRAM single in-line memory modules, as a significant departure from previous models from the competition still using custom memory modules. The motherboard incorporates a SCSI disk controller for an optional hard disk drive and a single AT expansion slot dedicated for the use of a network card to allow the system to attach to any of the three supported networks: Apollo Token Ring, IBM Token Ring, or Ethernet. Monochrome displays of up to 1280 x 1024 are supported, and the base configuration has a 1024 x 800 display. Based on the 68030 with 68882 floating-point unit running at 20 MHz, with 4 to 16 MB of RAM, the machine's list price of just under $4,000 reportedly represented "a major change in the price/performance ratio" for workstations. Educational institutions could purchase the base configuration starting at $2,500.

A merged line of workstations that runs either Domain/OS or HP-UX, was produced with the name HP/Apollo 425t and HP/Apollo 433s. The 425t is a "pizza box" design with a single network expansion slot. The 433s is a desk-side server systems with multiple expansion slots.

== Compatibility ==
PC compatibility is possible either through software emulation, using the optional product DPCE, or through a plug-in card carrying an Intel 80286 processor. A third-party plug-in card with a 386 was produced.

An Apollo Token Ring network card can be placed in a standard PC and network drivers connect it to a PC SMB (Server Message Block) file server.

== Usage ==
Apollo systems are easy to use and administer, but they became less cost-effective because the proprietary operating system made software more expensive than Unix software. The 68K processors are slower than the new RISC chips from Sun and Hewlett-Packard. Apollo addressed both problems by introducing the RISC-based DN10000 and Unix-friendly Domain/OS operating system. However, the DN10000, though fast, was extremely expensive, and a reliable version of Domain/OS came too late to make a difference. The increased speed and falling price of PCs ensured the obsolescence of high end systems such as Apollo workstations.

=== ARM CPU design ===
When Acorn Computers began designing the ARM 1 CPU in 1984, it used a single Apollo DN 600 workstation to do VLSI design with engineers taking shifts to use the machine. Later in the project they acquired additional workstations.

== Acquisition ==
In 1989, Hewlett-Packard acquired Apollo. They later released the DN2500 series workstation, a cheap alternative to the DN3x00/4x00 series, and then the HP 9000 Series 400 line, which can run either HP's own version of Unix, HP-UX, or Domain/OS. In this case, the choice had to be made at time of purchase, partly because HP-UX and Domain/OS functionality required different keyboards and mice. The Domain/OS variants also include a Token Ring card not provided for the HP-UX variants.
