= Pure Software =

American software tools company founded by Reed Hastings

- Industry: Software development tools
- Founded: October 1991
- Founder: Reed Hastings, Raymond Peck and Mark Box
- Fate: Merged with Atria Software to form Pure Atria Corporation; subsequently acquired by Rational Software
- Successor: Pure Atria Corporation
- Headquarters: Sunnyvale, California, United States
- Products: Purify, Quantify, PureLink

Pure Software was an American software development tools company founded in October 1991 by Reed Hastings, Raymond Peck and Mark Box. Its flagship product was Purify, a debugging and memory leak detection tool for Unix software applications written in C. The company is notable as the first significant venture of Reed Hastings, who later co-founded Netflix.

== History ==
Pure Software was founded in October 1991. Its original product, Purify, helped software developers detect memory errors and bugs in C programs by instrumenting compiled code to track memory usage at runtime. The company subsequently added complementary tools including Quantify, a performance profiler, and PureLink, a linker-based tool. Revenue doubled every year for four years, and the company went public on NASDAQ in August 1995, led by Morgan Stanley.

In August 1996, Pure Software merged with Atria Software to form Pure Atria Corporation. In August 1997, Rational Software acquired Pure Atria, a deal that gave Hastings the capital to start his next venture. The acquisition triggered a 42% drop in the stock prices of both companies. Hastings was appointed Chief Technical Officer of the combined company, but departed shortly after. He subsequently co-founded Netflix in 1997, later reflecting that management challenges at Pure Software had shaped his thinking about company culture.
