= List of Intel codenames =

Intel has historically named integrated circuit (IC) development projects after geographical names of towns, rivers or mountains near the location of the Intel facility responsible for the IC. Many of these are in the American West, particularly in Oregon (where most of Intel's CPU projects are designed; see famous codenames). As Intel's development activities have expanded, this nomenclature has expanded to Israel and India, and some older codenames refer to celestial bodies.

The following table lists known Intel codenames along with a brief explanation of their meaning and their likely namesake, and the year of their earliest known public appearance. Most processors after a certain date were named after cities that could be found on a map of the United States. This was done for trademark considerations. Banias was the last of the non-US city names. Gesher was renamed to Sandy Bridge to comply with the new rule. Dothan is a city both in Israel and in Alabama.

Codename	Category	Description	Named after	Year
Arrow Lake	Microprocessor	Intel 200S Series CPUs	Arrow Lake City of Normandy Park, WA	2024(?)
Acacia	Motherboard	Intel S460AC4 server motherboard. Has four sockets, uses the 460GX chipset, and supports the Itanium processor.	Acacia tree.	2000
Agate	Motherboard	Intel AG430HX motherboard. ATX form factor, 430HX chipset (Triton II), Socket 7. Supports the Pentium processor.	The semi-precious gemstone agate.	1996
Airmont	CPU architecture	Fourth-generation Atom processor, 14 nm. Successor to Silvermont. Expected in 2014.	Village in the town of Ramapo, New York	2011
Aitkens	Motherboard	Intel SAI2 server motherboard. ATX form factor, Socket 370, ServerWorks ServerSet III LE chipset. Supports one or two Pentium III processors.	Reference unknown.	2001
Aladdin	Motherboard	OEM version of the Zappa motherboard, manufactured for Gateway 2000. Also spelled Alladin.	Aladdin character of 1001 Arabian Nights.	1998
Alberta	Motherboard	Intel AB440ZX motherboard. ATX form factor, Slot 1, 440ZX chipset.	The Canadian province of Alberta.	1999
Alcolu	Motherboard	Intel S5000 series two-socket motherboards, for use in rack-mount servers. SSI TEB form factor, Socket J (LGA 771), 5000P (Blackford) chipset.	Probably Alcolu, a small community in Clarendon County, South Carolina, USA.	2006
Alder Lake	Microprocessor	Intel Core 12th generation CPUs	Alder Lake (Washington)	2021
Alder Poca	Motherboard	Intel AP450GX server motherboard. Non-standard form factor, Socket 8, 450GX chipset (Orion). Supports up to four Pentium Pro processors.	Alder is a common tree in the Pacific Northwest.	1997
Alderwood	Chipset	Intel 925X and 925XE chipsets, higher performance versions of Grantsdale. Successor to Canterwood.	Possibly Alderwood in Snohomish County, Washington, USA.	2003
Alfredo	Motherboard	Intel Classic/PCI i486 motherboard. Baby-AT form factor, 420EX chipset (Aries).	Named after the sauce, Alfredo.	1993
Aliceton	CPU	Successor to Tigerton. Renamed to Dunnington.	Unincorporated community in Boyle County	2006
Alief	Motherboard	Intel SE7520AF2 server motherboard. SSI EEB form factor, dual-CPU, Socket 604, E7520 chipset (Lindenhurst).	Alief, near Houston, Texas, USA.	2004
Allendale	CPU	Same as Conroe but with only 2 MB of cache instead of 4 MB. Sold as various Celeron, Pentium Dual-Core, Core 2 Duo, and Xeon models.	Reference unknown; see Allendale (disambiguation) for possibilities.	2005
Almador	Chipset	Intel 830M, 830MG, and 830MP chipsets, for use with the Celeron (Coppermine-128) and Pentium III-M (Tualatin) processors.	Reference unknown.	2000
Alpine Ridge	Bus controller	Thunderbolt 3 controller, 40 Gbit/s	Reference unknown.	2015
Alta	Network switch chip	Intel Ethernet Switch FM6000 Series, a family of 10 Gbit/s and 40 Gbit/s Ethernet switch chips. Originally the Fulcrum FocalPoint FM6000 and acquired by Intel with its 2011 purchase of Fulcrum Microsystems Inc.	City in Norway	2010
Altair	Motherboard	Intel ALTServer/CS server motherboard. Baby-AT form factor, Socket 5, dual-CPU, 430NX chipset (Neptune).	Reference unknown, possibly a reference to α Aquilae the main star in the Eagle Constellation; see Altair.	1998
Alton Bay	Motherboard	Intel D946GZAB desktop motherboard. MicroATX form factor, Socket T (LGA 775), 946GZ chipset (Lakeport).	Alton Bay, New Hampshire, USA.	2006
Alviso	Chipset	Intel 910GML, 915GMS, 915GM, 915GME, 910GMLE, and 915PM Express mobile chipsets, for use with the Celeron M and Pentium M (Banias, Dothan) processors.	Alviso, a small neighborhood in San Jose, California, the closest San Jose neighborhood to Intel's Santa Clara headquarters.	2004
Amber Lake	CPU architecture	Intel Core mobile low power 8th and 10th generation CPUs.	Amber Lake which runs adjacent along Amber, Washington.	2018
Anchorage	Motherboard	Intel AN430TX motherboard. ATX form factor, Socket 7, 430TX chipset (Triton IV).	The city of Anchorage, Alaska.	1997
Anchor Creek	Platform	Desktop platform combining the Pentium D (Smithfield) CPU with the 945G (Lakeport) and 955X (Glenwood) chipsets.	Reference unknown, possibly a stream in California.	2005
Andrews Lake	Motherboard	Intel DB65AL desktop motherboard. MicroATX form factor, Socket H2 (LGA 1155), B65 chipset (Cougar Point).	Andrews Lake in Willis, Texas.	2010
Aneroid Lake	Motherboard	Intel DG41AN desktop motherboard. Mini-ITX form factor, Socket T (LGA 775), G41 chipset (Eaglelake).	Aneroid Lake in the Eagle Cap Wilderness of Oregon, USA.	2010
Angel Isle	PCIe expansion card	Intel Knights Corner die, components and board.	Reference unknown.	2011
Anvik	LAN controller	Intel 82546 series Ethernet controllers. Dual-port, 1 Gbit/s, PCI-X, 150 nm.	Anvik, Alaska, USA.	2002
Apalachia	Motherboard	Intel DQ43AP desktop motherboard. MicroATX form factor, Socket T (LGA 775), Q43 chipset (Eaglelake).	Appalachian Mountains region of the United States.	2009
Apollo	Motherboard	Intel AP440FX motherboard. LPX form factor, Socket 8, 440FX chipset (Natoma).	The Greek god Apollo.	1997
Apple Glenn	Motherboard	Intel DH61AG and DH61AGE desktop motherboards. Mini-ITX (DH61AG) or thin Mini-ITX (DH61AGE), LGA 1155, H61 chipset (Cougar Point).	Reference unknown.	2011
Argus SR	LAN adapter	NetEffect Ethernet Server Cluster Adapter SFP+ SR. Single-port, fiber, 10 Gbit/s, PCIe 1.1.	Reference unknown.	2009
Aries	Chipset	Intel 420EX chipset, intended for use with i486 CPUs.	The constellation Aries.	1994
Arrandale	CPU	Dual-core mobile Celeron, Pentium, Core i3, Core i5, and Core i7 processors with integrated graphics. Same as Clarkdale, but supports only 8 GB of memory instead of 16 GB and has dynamic frequency control of the graphics core.	Settlement in British Columbia	2009
Aruba	Motherboard	Intel AR440BX motherboard. Manufactured by Intel for Dell. Uses the 440BX chipset.	Probably named after Aruba, an island of the Lesser Antilles in the Caribbean Sea.	2001
Ashland	Motherboard	Intel D845GLAD motherboard. Micro-ATX form factor, Socket 478, 845GL chipset (Brookdale-GL).	Reference unknown.	2002
Aspen Cabrillo	Server	Intel AC450NX server system. Combines the SC7100 chassis (Cabrillo) with the AC450NX motherboard (Polar) and the CBOTPBBD (Cabot) peripheral bay board.	Reference unknown.	1998
Aspen Drake	Server	Intel AD450NX server system.	Reference unknown.	1998
Aspen Hill	Motherboard	Intel 3000AH series server motherboards. ATX form factor, Socket T (LGA 775), 3000 chipset (Mukilteo).	Reference unknown.	2005
Atlanta	Motherboard	Intel AL440LX motherboard. ATX form factor, Slot 1, 440LX chipset (Balboa).	The city of Atlanta, Georgia.	1997
Atlantis	Motherboard	Intel Advanced/AS motherboard. Baby-AT form factor, Socket 7, 430FX chipset (Triton).	The mythical "lost continent" Atlantis.	1996
Attla	LAN controller	Intel 82545GM Ethernet controller. Single-port, 1 Gbit/s, PCI-X, 150 nm.	Reference unknown.	2003
Atwood	Motherboard	Intel D945PAW motherboard. MicroBTX form factor, Socket T (LGA 775), 945P chipset (Lakeport).	Reference unknown.	2005
Auburndale	CPU	Dual-core processor in the 45 nm Nehalem family, and the mobile corollary to Havendale. Canceled in favor of Arrandale.	Reference unknown; see Auburndale (disambiguation) for possibilities.	2008
Aubrey Isle	PCIe expansion card	MIC processor with 32 cores. 45 nm. Used in the Knights Ferry co-processor card.	Reference unknown.	2010
Augsburg	Motherboard	Intel D915GAG motherboard. Micro-ATX form factor, Socket T (LGA 775), 915G chipset (Grantsdale).	The City Augsburg in Germany.	2004
Aurora	Motherboard	Intel Performance/AU motherboard. ATX form factor, Socket 8, 450GX chipset (Orion).	Reference unknown.	1996
Avalon	Motherboard	Intel D915GAV motherboard. ATX form factor, Socket T (LGA775), 915G chipset (Grantsdale).	Reference unknown.	2004
Averill	Platform	Desktop platform combining the Pentium D (Smithfield) and Core 2 Duo (Conroe) CPUs with the Q963 and Q965 (Broadwater) chipsets, respectively.	Possibly named after Averill, a town in Essex County, Vermont.	2005
Avoton	SoC	Die shrink of Centerton to 22 nm.	A historical place in Putnam County, Tennessee, USA.	2012
Azalia	Technology	Intel High Definition Audio (HD audio) specification. Successor to AC'97.	Reference unknown.	2004
Bad Axe	Motherboard	Intel D975XBX enthusiast motherboard. ATX form factor, Socket T (LGA775), 975X chipset (Glenwood).	Bad Axe, Michigan.	2005
Bad Axe 2	Motherboard	Intel D975XBX2 enthusiast motherboard. A revision of the D975XBX (Bad Axe) motherboard.	Bad Axe, Michigan.	2006
Baker Bay	Motherboard	Intel SE7520BB2D2 server motherboard. SSI EEB form factor, Socket J (LGA771), E7520 chipset (Lindenhurst). Supports two dual-core Xeon LV processors (Sossaman).	Reference unknown.	2006
Balboa	Chipset	Intel 440LX chipset, intended for use with the Pentium II and Celeron CPUs.	Possibly named after Balboa, a subsection of the city of Newport Beach, Orange County, California.	1997
Bali	Motherboard	Intel BL440ZX motherboard. NLX form factor, Socket 370, 440ZX chipset.	The island of Bali in Indonesia.	1998
Bali	LAN	Intel Ethernet Switch FM4000 Series, a family of 10 Gbit/s Ethernet switch chips. Originally the Fulcrum FocalPoint FM4000 and acquired by Intel with its 2011 purchase of Fulcrum Microsystems Inc.	The island of Bali in Indonesia.	2008
Baldry Mt.	LAN adapter	Intel PRO/1000 MF Ethernet adapter. Single-port, fiber, 1 Gbit/s, PCI-X. Based on the 82545GM (Attla) controller.	Baldry Mountain, Alaska, USA.	2003
Bandera	Server	Intel SR870BN4 server. Four sockets for Itanium 2 processors, E8870 chipset, 4U chassis.	Reference unknown.	2002
Bangor	PMIC	Analog voltage regulator chip to accompany the Silverthorne CPU.	Bangor, Maine.	2008
Banias	CPU	The first-generation Pentium M processor. A heavily modified version of the 130 nm Pentium III (Tualatin) processor, optimized for power efficiency. Successor to Tualatin.	Banias, an ancient site in the Golan Heights.	2001
Banister	Chipset	Intel 440MX chipset, for use with the Pentium II, Pentium III, and Celeron mobile CPUs.	Reference unknown.	1998
Bar Harbor	Server	Intel SR870BH2 server. E8870 chipset, 2U chassis. Supports one or two Itanium 2 processors.	Bar Harbor, Maine.	2006
Barnroof Point	Motherboard	Intel WX58BP workstation motherboard. ATX form factor, Socket B (LGA1366), X58 chipset (Tylersburg).	Barnroof Point, Colorado, USA.	2009
Bartman	Motherboard	Intel SE7221BA1-E server motherboard. ATX form factor, Socket T (LGA775), E7221 chipset (Copper River).	The superhero nickname of the character Bart Simpson.	2006
Barton Hills	LAN controller	Intel 82580 series Ethernet controllers. Quad-port, 1 Gbit/s, PCIe 2.0, 90 nm.	Barton Hills, a neighborhood in Austin, Texas, near an Intel facility.	2010
Bartonville	LAN adapter	Intel I340 series server Ethernet adapters. Quad-port, copper/fiber, 1 Gbit/s, PCIe 2.0. Based on the 82580 (Barton Hills) controller.	Bartonville, Texas, USA.	2010
Batman	Motherboard	Intel Premiere/PCI ED motherboard. Baby-AT form factor, Socket 4, 430LX chipset (Mercury).	The fictional superhero Batman.	1993
Batman's Revenge	Motherboard	Intel Premiere/PCI ED motherboard. Baby-AT form factor, Socket 4, 430LX chipset (Mercury). Supports the 66 MHz Pentium, which Batman does not.	The fictional superhero Batman.	1993
Baton Rouge	Motherboard	Intel BA810E motherboard. Socket 370, 810E chipset (Whitney).	Baton Rouge, Louisiana, USA.	2000
Battle Lake	Motherboard	Intel D915PBL motherboard. ATX form factor, Socket T (LGA775), 915P chipset (Grantsdale).	Reference unknown.	2004
Baxter Peak	WLAN	Intel WiMax Connection 2400, a WLAN chip. An optional component of the Menlow platform.	Reference unknown.	2007
Bayfield	Motherboard	Intel D865GBF motherboard. ATX form factor, Socket 478, 865G chipset (Springdale).	Reference unknown.	2003
Baytown	Motherboard	Intel SBT2 server motherboard. ATX form factor, two Slot 2 sockets, ServerWorks ServerSet III LE chipset.	Reference unknown.	2000
Bay Lake	Motherboard	Intel Bay Trail-T pre-production Customer Reference Board tablet motherboard.	Possibly Bay Lake, Florida, USA.	2012
Bay Trail	SoC	Intel Atom Processor E3800 Product Family and Intel Celeron Processor N2807/N2930/J1900	The San Francisco Bay Trail, which is located a few miles from Intel HQ in Santa Clara, CA.	2014
Bear Canyon	Motherboard	Intel D945GBO motherboard. Micro-BTX form factor, Socket T (LGA775), 945G chipset (Lakeport-G).	Reference unknown.	2006
Bearlake	Chipset	Intel G31, G33, G35, P31, P35, Q33, Q35, X38, and X48 Express chipsets, some with integrated graphics, some without. For use with the Pentium Dual-Core, Core 2 Duo, Core 2 Quad, and Core 2 Extreme CPUs. Successor to the 965 (Broadwater) series.	Bear Lake, a natural freshwater lake divided by the Utah-Idaho border in the Western United States.	2006
Bear Point	Motherboard	Intel DH61BE motherboard. Micro-ATX form factor, Socket H2 (LGA 1155), H61 chipset (Cougar Point).	Reference unknown.	2011
Bear Ridge	Wireless	IoT gateway solution, manufactured by Gigabyte.	Reference unknown.	2016
Beartooth Pass	Motherboard	Intel S1200BTL and S1200BTS server motherboards. Based on the C204 and C202 (Cougar Point) chipsets. ATX and MicroATX form factors, LGA 1155.	Beartooth Pass, a street in Accident, Maryland, USA.	2011
Bearup Lake	Motherboard	Intel DH67BL desktop motherboard. Based on the H67 Express chipset (Cougar Point). MicroATX form factor, LGA 1155.	Bearup Lake in Tuolumne, California, USA.	2011
Beckton	CPU	The Xeon 6500 and 7500 series CPUs, with 4, 6, or 8 cores, intended for large multi-socket servers. Part of the 45 nm Nehalem family. Also spelled Becton, and also called Nehalem-EX.	Possibly Becton Street in Klamath Falls, Oregon.	2008
Bellefontaine	LAN adapter	Intel XF LR server Ethernet adapter. Single-port, fiber, 10 Gbit/s, PCIe. Based on the 82598EB controller chip (Oplin).	Bellefontaine, Ohio, USA.	2007
Bensley	Platform	Two-way server platform combining the Xeon 5000 (Dempsey), 5100 (Woodcrest), and 5300 (Clovertown) CPUs with the 5000P (Blackford) chipset.	Reference uncertain; possibly after Bensley Flat, Malheur County, Oregon, or Bensley, a census-designated place in Chesterfield County, Virginia.	2005
Berg Lake	Flash cache	Turbo Memory module in the Robson flash cache.	Berg Lake, near Mount Robson.	2007
Berryville	CPU	Media processor (Atom CE5300) aimed at set-top boxes and media gateways for the living room	Reference unknown.	2012
Bigby	Chipset	Intel 3200 and 3210 chipsets, for use in single-socket servers with various Core-based CPUs, including Celeron, Core 2 Duo, Core 2 Quad, and the Xeon 3000 series (Conroe, Kentsfield, Wolfdale, Yonah, Yorkfield).	Reference unknown.	2007
Bighorn Peak	Chassis	Intel R2000 series 2U rackmount server chassis.	Reference unknown.	2011
Big Lake	Motherboard	Intel D945GBI motherboard. BTX form factor, Socket T (LGA775), 945G chipset (Lakeport-G). OEM board for Gateway.	Reference unknown.	2006
Big Laurel	RAID adapter	Intel RS2BL040 (4-port) and RS2BL080 (8-port) RAID adapters. SAS or SATA, 6.0 Gbit/s, PCIe 2.0. Based on the SAS2108 chip from LSI Logic.	Reference unknown.	2009
Big Sur	Motherboard	Server motherboard supporting two Itanium (Merced) processors. Uses the 460GX chipset.	Big Sur, California, USA.	2000
Billings	Motherboard	Intel D845BG motherboard. ATX form factor, Socket 478, 845 chipset (Brookdale).	Billings, Montana.	2001
Bimini	Motherboard	Intel BI440ZX motherboard. Micro-ATX form factor, Socket 370 PPGA, 440ZX chipset.	Bimini, the westernmost district of the Bahamas.	1998
Birchwood	Motherboard	Intel BW810 motherboard. OEM board used by Dell in the WebPC.	Reference unknown.	1999
Bisbee	RAID controller	Intel SRCU32, a dual-channel Ultra-160 SCSI RAID controller.	Reference unknown.	2001
Blackford	Chipset	Intel 5000P, 5000V, and 5000Z chipsets, for use in two-socket servers with the 65 nm Core-based Xeon 5000, 5100, and 5300 series (Dempsey, Woodcrest, and Clovertown) CPUs and the 45 nm Penryn-based Xeon 5200 and 5400 series (Wolfdale and Harpertown) CPUs.	Reference unknown; see Blackford (disambiguation) for possibilities.	2004
Black Canyon	Motherboard	Intel D925XBC desktop motherboard. Micro-ATX form factor, Socket T (LGA775), 925X (Alderwood) chipset.	Reference unknown.	2004
Black Canyon-2	Motherboard	Intel D925XEBC2 desktop motherboard. Micro-ATX form factor, Socket T (LGA775), 925XE (Alderwood-XE) chipset.	Reference unknown.	2004
Black Creek	Motherboard	Intel D955XBK desktop motherboard. ATX form factor, Socket T (LGA775), 955X (Glenwood) chipset.	Reference unknown.	2005
Black Pine	Motherboard	Intel BP810 OEM desktop motherboard. 810 chipset (Whitney). Used in the Barbie PC, among others.	Reference unknown.	2002
Black Rapids	Motherboard	Intel D955XBP desktop motherboard.	Reference unknown.	
Bloomfield	CPU	The Core i7-920, -930, -940, -950, and -960, the Core i7-965 and -975 Extreme Edition, and the Xeon 3500 series, all of which are quad-core except for the Xeon W3503 and W3505, which are dual-core. Part of the 45 nm Nehalem family. Successor to Yorkfield.	Reference unknown; see Bloomfield (disambiguation) for possibilities.	2005
Blue Hills	Motherboard	Intel DZ77BH55K desktop motherboard. ATX form factor, LGA 1155, Z77 chipset (Panther Point).	Reference unknown.	2012
Blue Mountain	Motherboard	Intel D845EBT motherboard. ATX form factor, Socket 478, 845E chipset (Brookdale-E).	Reference unknown.	2002
Bluff Creek	Motherboard	Intel S5500BC server motherboard. SSI CEB form factor, Socket B (LGA1366), 5500 chipset (Tylersburg). Server systems based on this motherboard are also code-named Bluff Creek.	Reference unknown.	2009
Boazman	LAN controller	Intel 82567 series Ethernet PHY. Single port, 1 Gbit/s, 90 nm. Also called Boaz.	Hebrew reference to the saying "the time has come".	2007
Bobcat Peak	Chassis	Intel H2000 series half-width server chassis.	Peak in the Sierra Nevadas.	2011
Boiler Bay	RAID adapter	Intel SRCSAS144E RAID adapter. Four-port, SAS or SATA, 3.0 Gbit/s, PCIe 1.0. Based on the IOP333 I/O controller (Stockton).	Boiler Bay, Oregon, USA.	2006
Bolton	LAN adapter	Intel PRO/1000 PF server Ethernet adapter. Quad-port, fiber, 1 Gbit/s, PCIe. Based on the 82571 controller chip (Ophir).	City in MA.	2005
Bonanza	Motherboard	Intel D875PBZ desktop motherboard. ATX form factor, Socket 478, 875P (Canterwood) chipset.	Reference unknown.	2003
Bonetrail	Motherboard	Intel DX38BT Extreme Series motherboard, based on the X38 Express (Bearlake) chipset and supporting various 65 nm (Conroe) and 45 nm (Penryn, Wolfdale, Yorkfield) CPUs. ATX form factor, socket LGA775.	Possibly Bonetrail, a township in Williams County, North Dakota.	2007
Bonham	Motherboard	Intel S815EBM1 server motherboard. Micro-ATX form factor, Socket 370, 815E (Solano) chipset.	Reference unknown.	2001
Bonita	RAID controller	Intel SRCU31, a single-channel Ultra-160 SCSI RAID PCI adapter card.	Reference unknown.	2000
Bonnell	CPU architecture	First-generation Atom processor, 45 nm.	Mount Bonnell, Austin, Texas	2007
Bordenville	Platform	Microserver platform built around the Centerton Atom processor.	Reference unknown.	2012
Boston	Motherboard	Intel BN440FX server motherboard. Slot 1, 440FX (Natoma) chipset.	Boston, Massachusetts, USA.	2002
Boulder Creek	Platform	Desktop platform combining the Core 2 Quad Q8000 and Q9000 series (Penryn and Yorkfield) CPUs with the desktop 4 series (Eaglelake) chipsets. Successor to Salt Creek.	Probably named after Boulder Creek, in Boulder Colorado.	2007
Boxboro	Chipset	Intel 7500 chipset, for large servers with up to eight sockets. Supports the Xeon 6500 and 7500 series (Nehalem-EX) and Xeon E7 series (Westmere-EX) CPUs, and the Itanium 9300 series (Tukwila) CPUs.	Probably named after Boxborough, a town in Middlesex County, Massachusetts.	2007
Bozeman	Motherboard	Intel D815BN desktop motherboard. Micro-ATX form factor, Socket 370, 815 (Solano) chipset.	Bozeman, Montana, USA.	2000
Braiden Creek	Motherboard	Intel DZ68BC motherboard. ATX form factor, Socket H2 (LGA 1155), Z68 chipset (Cougar Point).	Reference unknown.	2011
Braidwood	Flash cache	Flash memory I/O acceleration system. Successor to Robson.	Possible named after Braidwood, Illinois.	2009
Brakefield Bend	Motherboard	Intel DG41BI desktop motherboard. MicroATX form factor, Socket T (LGA 775), G41 chipset (Eaglelake).	Reference unknown.	2010
Brandon	Motherboard	Intel SE7520BD2 two-socket server motherboard. SSI EEB form factor, Socket 604, E7520 chipset (Lindenhurst).	Reference unknown.	2004
Breeds Hill	Chipset	Intel i848P chipset, for use with Celeron, Celeron D, and Pentium 4 (Northwood, Prescott) CPUs.	Probably named after Breed's Hill, the actual site where the Battle of Bunker Hill took place during the American Revolution, located in the Charlestown section of Boston, Massachusetts	2003
Braswell	SoC	consumer SoCs aimed at PCs	Reference unknown	
Bretona	LAN adapter	Intel PRO/1000 PF server Ethernet adapter. Dual-port, fiber, 1 Gbit/s, PCIe 1.0. Based on the 82571EB controller chip (Ophir).	Reference unknown.	2005
Brickland	Platform	High-end server platform based on the Ivy Bridge-EX processor.	Reference unknown.	2010
Bridge Creek	Platform	Home desktop platform combining the Pentium D (Presler) and Core 2 Duo (Conroe) CPUs with the G965 and P965 (Broadwater) chipsets.	Probably named after Bridge Creek, a creek in Oregon.	2005
Briertown	PMIC	Power management chip to accompany Langwell in the Moorestown platform. Intel calls Briertown a MSIC. Also spelled Brierstown.	Reference unknown.	2009
Broadwater	Chipset	Intel Q963, Q965, P965, and G965 Express chipsets. All but the P965 have integrated graphics. Compatible with CPUs in the Cedar Mill, Prescott, Smithfield, Presler, and Conroe lines.	Reference unknown; possibly Broadwater, Nebraska.	2005
Broadwell	CPU architecture	Die shrink of Haswell from 22 nm to 14 nm. Formerly named Rockwell. Abbreviated BDW.	Broadwell, city in IL.	2014
Bromolow	Platform	Reference board using Sandy Bridge CPU and the Cougar Point chipset. Intel Xeon E3 and C202, C204, C206. The C202 and C204 chips are aimed at entry servers, while the C206 is aimed at workstations with integrated HD Graphics.	Reference unknown.	2011
Brookdale	Chipset	Intel 845 series chipsets, for use with the Pentium 4, Celeron, and Celeron D processors.	Reference unknown; see Brookdale (disambiguation) for possibilities.	2000
Brownsville	Motherboard	Intel D845GBV motherboard. ATX form factor, Socket 478, 845G chipset (Brookdale-G).	Brownsville, Texas, USA.	2002
Brownsville-2	Motherboard	Intel D845GEBV2 and D845GERG2 motherboards. ATX (for the D845GEBV2) or Micro-ATX (for the D845GERG2) form factors, Socket 478, 845GE chipset (Brookdale-GE).	Brownsville, Texas, USA.	2002
Bryson	Motherboard	Intel SE7501BR2 two-socket server motherboard. SSI EEB form factor, Socket 604, E7501 (Plumas) chipset.	Reference unknown.	2004
Buckeye	Motherboard	Intel BB440FX two-socket server motherboard. Socket 8, 440FX (Natoma) chipset. Supports the Pentium Pro processor.	Buckeye, AZ, a suburb of Phoenix, AZ near Intel's Chandler campuses.	1996
Buckner	Motherboard	Intel SE7221BK1-E server motherboard. ATX form factor, Socket T (LGA775), E7221 (Copper River) chipset.	Reference unknown.	2005
Buffalo Creek	Motherboard	Intel DG33BU desktop motherboard. MicroATX form factor, Socket T (LGA 775), G33 chipset (Bearlake).	Reference unknown.	2007
Buffalo Flat	Motherboard	Intel DP67BA desktop motherboard. ATX form factor, Socket H2 (LGA 1155), P67 (Cougar Point) chipset.	Reference unknown.	2010
Bull Mountain	Technology	Intel Secure Key, a digital random number generator.	Bull Mountain, Oregon	2011
Bulverde	CPU	The PXA270 family of XScale processors.	Bulverde, a city in Comal County, Texas.	2003
Burrage	Motherboard	Intel DP67BG enthusiast desktop motherboard. ATX form factor, Socket H2 (LGA 1155), P67 (Cougar Point) chipset.	Reference unknown.	2010
Byfield	Motherboard	Intel DP43BF desktop motherboard. ATX form factor, Socket T (LGA 775), P43 chipset (Eaglelake).	Reference unknown.	2010
Byfield Lite	Motherboard	Intel DP43BFL desktop motherboard. ATX form factor, Socket T (LGA 775), P43 chipset (Eaglelake). Uses the ICH10 hub in place of the ICH10R found in Byfield.	Reference unknown.	2010
Byrd	Chassis	Intel SR2000 2U server chassis.	The explorer Admiral Richard Byrd.	2000
Byrd II	Chassis	Intel SR2100 2U server chassis.	The explorer Admiral Richard Byrd.	2000
Cabot	Board	Intel CBOTPBBD peripheral bay board.	Reference unknown.	1998
Cactus Ridge	Bus controller	Thunderbolt controller chips. Copper, 2 or 4 channels, 10 Gbit/s.	Reference unknown.	2011
Caldwell	RAID controller	Intel SRCZCR RAID controller. Dual-channel SCSI Ultra-160 or Ultra-320, PCI 2.2. Uses the Intel 80303 I/O processor.	Reference unknown.	2002
Calexico	Wi-Fi	Intel PRO/Wireless 2100B, an 802.11b mini-PCI Wi-Fi adapter. Part of the Carmel platform.	Calexico, a city in Imperial County, California.	2002
Calexico 2	Wi-Fi	Intel PRO/Wireless 2100BG, an 802.11g mini-PCI Wi-Fi adapter, used in the Carmel platform, and also the 2915ABG, used in the Sonoma platform.	Calexico, a city in Imperial County, California.	2003
Calistoga	Chipset	Intel Mobile 945 Express-series chipset.	Calistoga, a city in Napa County, California.	2004
Callahan	Motherboard	Intel S5000VCL family of two-socket server motherboards. SSI CEB form factor, Socket J (LGA771), 5000V chipset (Blackford).	Reference unknown.	2007
Calpella	Platform	Sixth-generation Centrino, a mobile platform combining various Core i3/i5/i7 (Clarksfield and Arrandale) CPUs with the QM57, QS57, HM57, HM55, and PM55 (Ibex Peak-M) chipsets. Successor to Montevina.	Calpella, an unincorporated community in Mendocino County, California.	2008
Camino	Chipset	Intel 820 chipset, used with the Pentium II, Pentium III, and Celeron processors.	Camino, California. A small town in El Dorado County, California. Apple Hill is located in Camino.	1999
Caneland	Platform	Four-way server platform combining the Xeon 7200 and 7300 series (Tigerton) CPUs with the 7300 (Clarksboro) chipset. Successor to Truland, in favor of the cancelled Reidland.	Reference unknown.	2005
Canmore	SoC	The CE3100 processor, intended for consumer electronics. Successor to the CE2110 but based on the x86 instruction set rather than the ARM architecture.	Possibly named after Canmore, Alberta.	2007
Cannon Lake	CPU architecture	Die shrink of Skylake to 10 nm, formerly called Skymont.	Reference unknown.	2017
Cannonville	Motherboard	Intel D845PECE motherboard. Micro-ATX form factor, Socket 478, 845PE chipset (Brookdale-PE).	Reference unknown.	2002
Canoe Creek	Motherboard	Intel D2500CC and D2500CCE desktop motherboards. Mini-ITX form factor, Atom D2500 processor (Cedarview), NM10 chipset (Tiger Point).	Reference unknown.	2012
Canoe Lake	Technology	Scheme for cooling ultra-thin Atom-based notebook computers.	Reference unknown.	2010
Canoe Pass	Motherboard	Intel S2600CP two-socket motherboards, intended for pedestal servers. SSI EEB form factor, Socket R (LGA 2011), C600 chipset (Patsburg). Supports the Xeon E5-2600 CPU (Jaketown).	Reference unknown.	2011
Canterwood	Chipset	Intel 875P chipset, used with Pentium 4 CPUs.	Reference unknown; Possibly named after Canterwood Golf and Country Club in Port Orchard, Washington.	2003
Canterwood-ES	Chipset	Intel E7210 server chipset, supporting two Xeon CPUs.	Reference unknown; Possibly named after Canterwood Golf and Country Club in Port Orchard, Washington.	2003
Cantiga	Chipset	Intel GL40, GM45, GS40, GS45, and PM45 Mobile Express chipsets. All but the PM45 have GMA X4500HD integrated graphics. Part of the Montevina platform.	Reference unknown.	2008
Canyon Peak	WLAN adapter	Intel Centrino Wireless-N 105 and 135 WLAN adapters. Single channel, single-band, 802.11b/g/n. The 135 includes support for Bluetooth.	Reference unknown.	2012
Cape Cod	Motherboard	Intel CC820 motherboard. ATX form factor, Slot 1, 820 chipset (Camino).	Cape Cod, Massachusetts, USA.	1999
Capulet	Flash memory	Intel M18 StrataFlash memory, a 65 nm MLC NOR flash memory chip.	Capulet is Juliet's last name in Shakespeare's Romeo and Juliet.	2006
Carbonado	Platform	PDA reference platform combining the PXA270 XScale processor (Bulverde) with the 2700G graphics accelerator (Marathon).	Possibly Carbonado, Washington	2004
Cariboo River	Flash cache	Intel Turbo Memory for desktop systems. Attaches via a PCIe x1 link.	Reference unknown.	2007
Carlow	Platform	Workstation platform combining the Xeon E3-1200v2 processor (Ivy Bridge) with the C216 chipset (Panther Point).	Reference unknown.	2011
Carmack	Motherboard	Intel D865PCK motherboard. Micro-ATX form factor, Socket 478, 865P chipset (Springdale-P).	Reference unknown.	2005
Carmel	Platform	First-generation Centrino, a mobile platform combining the Pentium M (Banias and Dothan) CPUs with the 855 (Odem and Montara) chipsets.	Carmel-by-the-Sea, California. A small town with a rich artistic history located on the Monterey Peninsula.	1999
Carretta	Motherboard	Intel SE7230CA1-E single-socket server motherboard. Custom narrow form factor, Socket T (LGA775), E7230 chipset (Mukilteo).	Reference unknown.	2006
Cascades	CPU	Second version of the Pentium III Xeon, based on the 180 nm Coppermine. Successor to Tanner.	The Cascade Range, a major mountain range of western North America.	1998
Cascade Lake	CPU architecture	Successor to Intel Skylake, 14 nanometer server, workstation and enthusiast processor microarchitecture	Lake Cascade, Idaho	2019
Castine	Network processor	Intel IXP2400 network processor.	Castine, Maine	2002
Castle Point	SSD	Intel Z-P230 solid state drive for notebook computers. MLC, PATA.	Reference unknown.	2008
Caswell	Wi-Fi	Wi-Fi component integrated into the ICH6W I/O controller hub.	Possibly named after Caswell County, North Carolina.	2004
Cave Creek	Chipset	Offload processor for high-density servers. Part of the Crystal Forest platform.	Cave Creek, Arizona, USA.	2012
Cayman	Motherboard	Intel CA810 motherboard. Micro-ATX form factor, Socket 370, 810 chipset (Whitney).	Probably after the Cayman Islands.	1999
Cayman 2	Motherboard	Intel CA810E motherboard. Micro-ATX form factor, Socket 370, 810E chipset (Whitney).	Probably after the Cayman Islands.	1999
Cedarview	CPU	Intel Atom D2500, D2550, D2600, D2700, and D2800 processors, all dual-core. Part of the 32 nm Saltwell family.	Reference unknown.	2009
Cedar Cove	LAN adapter	Intel CX4 server Ethernet adapter. Dual-port, copper, 10 Gbit/s, PCIe. Based on the 82598EB (Oplin) controller chip.	Reference unknown.	2008
Cedar Mill	CPU	Die shrink of Prescott to 65 nm. The final revision of the Pentium 4. Successor to Prescott.	Cedar Mill, itself named after a sawmill on what became Cedar Mill Creek in Washington County, Oregon, west of the Willamette Stone.	2005
Cedar Trail	Platform	Netbook and entry-level desktop platform combining the Cedarview Atom processor with the NM10 (Tiger Point) chipset. Successor to Pine Trail.	Reference unknown.	2010
Centerton	SoC	Atom S1200, a dual-core SoC aimed at low-power, high-density servers. Part of the 32 nm Saltwell family.	Centerton, Arkansas, USA.	2012
Chattanooga	Motherboard	Intel CN430TX motherboard. NLX form factor, Socket 7, 430TX chipset (Triton IV).	Chattanooga, Tennessee, USA.	1997
Cherry Creek	Motherboard	Intel D915PCY motherboard. ATX form factor, Socket T (LGA775), 915P chipset (Grantsdale).	Reference unknown.	2004
Cherrypeak	Graphics card	Intel Larrabee/Knights Ferry CRB (Customer Reference Board).	Presumably Cherry Peak, Utah.	2009
Cherryvale	Co-processor	Intel Knights Corner Xeon Phi board design.	Reference unknown.	2012
Cherryville	SSD	Intel 520 series solid-state drives, 25 nm MLC, SATA 6 Gbit/s. Successor to Elmcrest.	Reference unknown.	2011
Chevelon	I/O processor	Intel IOP341 and IOP342 I/O processors, built around the XScale architecture.	Probably named after a place in Arizona.	2007
Chief River	Platform	Eight-generation Centrino mobile platform. Combines the Ivy Bridge CPU with the HM76 and QM77 chipsets (Panther Point).	Reference unknown.	2012
Chilito	RAID controller	Intel SRCU42L integrated RAID controller. Dual-channel, Ultra320 SCSI, PCI. Uses the Intel 80303 I/O processor.	Reference unknown.	2003
Chilito 2	RAID controller	Intel SRCU42X RAID controller. Dual-channel, Ultra320 SCSI, PCI-X. Uses the LSI Logic 53C1030 controller chip.	Reference unknown.	2003
Chisholm Trail	Motherboard	Intel D955XCS desktop motherboard. BTX form factor, Socket T (LGA 775), 955X chipset (Glenwood).	The Chisholm Trail, used for driving cattle from Texas to Kansas City.	2005
Chivano	CPU	Itanium 2 9000 (Montecito) with only two cores. However, there was never a Montecito with more than two cores, so Chivano was not needed.	Reference unknown.	2002
Cibolo	LAN controller	Intel 82597X Ethernet controller. Single-port, 10 Gbit/s, PCI-X, 90 nm.	Cibolo, Texas, USA.	2004
Clackamas	CPU architecture	Later codename for the Intel 64 project, originally code-named Yamhill.	Clackamas River, a river in Oregon.	2004
Claremont	CPU	An experimental Pentium CPU capable of operating at power levels under 10 mW; Intel calls this a near-threshold voltage processor.	Reference unknown.	2011
Clarkdale	CPU	Dual-core desktop Pentium, Core i3, and Core i5 processors, and the Xeon L3406. Includes the Ironlake graphics controller and memory controller hub in the same package but on a separate 45 nm die. Part of the 32 nm Westmere family.	Intel has a FAB facility in Arizona, and Clarkdale, Arizona may be the reference.	2009
Clarksboro	Chipset	Intel 7300 chipset, for use in four-socket servers with the Xeon 7200 and 7300 series (Tigerton) and 7400 series (Dunnington) CPUs. Part of the Caneland platform. Successor to Twin Castle.	Reference uncertain. Clarksboro is a historic area of Gloucester County, New Jersey.	2006
Clarksfield	CPU	Core i7 Mobile, a quad-core processor in the 45 nm Nehalem family. Closely related to Lynnfield.	Clarksfield is a township in Huron County, Ohio, USA.	2008
Clarkville	LAN controller	Gigabit Ethernet controller accompanying the Lynx Point chipset, expected in the Haswell time frame.	Reference unknown.	2012
Clear Bay	Chassis	Intel MFSYS25 and MFSYS35 modular server chassis. 6U blade servers supporting up to six blades.	Reference unknown.	2007
Clear Fork	Motherboard	Intel DH67CF desktop motherboard. Mini-ITX form factor, Socket H2 (LGA 1155), H67 chipset (Cougar Point).	Reference unknown.	2011
Clearwater	Motherboard	Intel SE7500CW2 two-socket server board. Extended ATX form factor, Socket 603, E7500 chipset (Plumas).	Reference unknown.	2003
Clems Cove	Motherboard	Intel DH61CR desktop motherboard. Micro-ATX form factor, Socket H2 (LGA 1155), H61 chipset (Cougar Point).	Reference unknown.	2011
Clovertown	CPU	Xeon 5300 series. Quad-core, consisting of two dual-core Woodcrest dies on a multi-chip module. Part of the 65 nm Conroe family.	Reference unknown.	2005
Cloverview	SoC	Atom Z2760 processor, aimed at tablet computers. Dual-core, integrated graphics. Part of the 32 nm Saltwell family. Successor to Cedarview.	Reference unknown.	2011
Clover Trail	Platform	Tablet computing platform based on the Cloverview Atom processor. Successor to Cedar Trail.	Reference unknown.	2011
Coconut Creek	Motherboard	Intel D945GCCR motherboard. Micro-ATX form factor, Socket T (LGA775), 945GC chipset (Lakeport-GC).	Reference unknown.	2007
Coffee Lake	CPU architecture	The second 14 nm process refinement of Intel's mainstream performance CPUs following both Skylake and Kaby Lake.	Coffee Lake Wetlands, southwest of Portland, OR	2017
Cold Lake	Motherboard	Intel DH67CL desktop motherboard. ATX form factor, Socket H2 (LGA 1155), H67 chipset (Cougar Point).	Reference unknown.	2011
Colleyville	LAN controller	Intel 82583V Ethernet controller. Single-port, 1 Gbit/s, PCIe 1.0a.	Colleyville, Texas, USA.	2009
Colusa	Chipset	Intel 860 chipset, for use in two-socket Xeon (Foster) systems.	Either named after Colusa, California or after Colusa County of which this city is the seat.	2001
Comanche Creek	Motherboard	Intel D915PCM motherboard. Micro-ATX form factor, Socket T (LGA 775), 915P chipset (Grantsdale).	Reference unknown.	2004
Condor Peak	WLAN adapter	Intel Centrino Wireless-N 1000 WLAN adapter. 1x2, 802.11b/g/n, PCIe. Part of the Calpella Centrino platform.	Reference unknown.	2009
Conroe	CPU	First implementation of the Core microarchitecture, sold as Core 2 Duo, Xeon, Pentium Dual-Core, and Celeron. Most Conroes are dual-core, although some single-core versions were also produced. Successor to both Yonah, of Pentium M lineage, and to Cedar Mill, the final generation of the NetBurst microarchitecture. 65 nm.	Conroe, Texas	2004
Cooper River	Motherboard	Intel DG41KR desktop motherboard. Micro-ATX form factor, Socket T (LGA 775), G41 chipset (Eaglelake).	Reference unknown.	2009
Coos Bay	Motherboard	Intel SCB2 two-socket server motherboard. Server ATX form factor, Socket 370, ServerWorks ServerSet III HE-SL chipset.	Coos Bay, Oregon, USA.	2002
Coppermine	CPU	Second-generation Pentium III processor. 180 nm, and later 130 nm. Successor to Katmai.	Reference unknown; see Coppermine (disambiguation) for possibilities.	1998
Copper Pass	Motherboard	Intel S2600CO two-socket motherboards, aimed at pedestal servers. SSI EEB form factor, Socket R (LGA 2011), C600 chipset (Patsburg). Supports the Xeon E5-2600 CPU (Jaketown).	Reference unknown.	2011
Copper Pond	LAN adapter	Intel AT and AT2 server Ethernet adapters. Single-port, copper, 10 Gbit/s, PCIe 2.0. Based on the 82598EB (Oplin) controller chip.	Reference unknown.	2008
Copper River	Chipset	Intel E7221 chipset, for workstations and entry-level servers using Pentium 4 processors. Similar to Grantsdale.	The Copper River or Ahtna River is a river in south-central Alaska in the United States	2004
Cordova	LAN controller	Intel 82544 series Ethernet controllers. Single-port, 1 Gbit/s, PCI-X, 180 nm.	Likely named for Rancho Cordova, California which is near Intel's Folsom plant.	2001
Corner Field	Motherboard	Intel DG41CN desktop motherboard. Micro-ATX form factor, Socket T (LGA 775), G41 chipset (Eaglelake).	Reference unknown.	2009
Corsair	Workstation	Intel Professional/GX workstation. LPX form factor, EISA/ISA, Socket 3, 350DT chipset.	Reference unknown.	1991
Cortez	Motherboard	Intel D945GCZ desktop motherboard. Micro-BTX form factor, Socket T (LGA 775), 945G chipset (Lakeport-G).	Reference unknown.	2005
Coryville	Motherboard	Intel D945GCL motherboard. Micro-ATX form factor, Socket T (LGA 775), 945G chipset (Lakeport-G).	Reference unknown.	2006
Cotulla	CPU	Intel PXA250 family of XScale processors. 180 nm.	Reference unknown.	2002
Cougar Canyon	Motherboard	Customer reference board combining the Sandy Bridge CPU and the Cougar Point chipset.	Reference unknown.	2010
Cougar Point	Chipset	Intel 6 series desktop and mobile chipsets, and the C200 series chipsets for workstations and entry-level servers. Successor to Ibex Peak.	Possibly named after a peak in Edge Hills Provincial Park, British Columbia, Canada.	2010
Coupeville	Motherboard	Intel DQ965CO desktop motherboard. Micro-BTX form factor, Socket T (LGA775), Q965 chipset (Broadwater).	Coupeville, Washington, USA.	2006
Covington	CPU	First-generation Celeron processor. Essentially a Deschutes Pentium II with no cache. 250 nm.	Reference unknown; see Covington (disambiguation) for possibilities.	1997
Coyanosa	CPU	Intel XScale 80200 stand-alone processor.	Coyanosa, Texas, USA.	2002
Cranberry Lake	Platform	Two-socket server platform combining various Xeon (Clovertown, Harpertown, Wolfdale, Woodcrest) CPUs with the 5100 (San Clemente) chipset. Successor to Bensley.	Cranberry Lake is a lake in the Adirondack Mountains and the Adirondack State Park in New York.	2007
Cranford	CPU	An MP version of Nocona. Part of the 90 nm Prescott family.	Reference unknown; see Cranford (disambiguation) for possibilities.	2004
Creede	Motherboard	Intel D865PCD motherboard. Micro-ATX form factor, Socket 478, 865P chipset (Springdale-P).	Reference unknown.	2004
Crestline	Chipset	Intel GL960, GLE960, GM965, GME965, and PM965 Mobile Express chipsets. Most models have GMA X3000 graphics integrated on-die. Used in the Santa Rosa platform.	Reference unknown; see Crestline (disambiguation) for possibilities.	2006
Crow Point	Motherboard	Intel DQ67OW desktop motherboard. Micro-ATX form factor, Socket H2 (LGA 1155), Q67 chipset (Cougar Point).	Reference unknown.	2010
Crown Bay	Motherboard	Development board for the Queens Bay platform.	Reference unknown.	2009
Crown Beach	Motherboard	Development board for the Menlow platform.	Reference unknown.	2007
Crown Pass	Motherboard	Intel W2600CR2 two-socket workstation motherboard. Custom form factor, Socket R (LGA 2011), C600 chipset (Patsburg). Supports the Xeon E5-2600 CPU (Jaketown).	Reference unknown.	2011
Crystal Cove	PMIC	Power Management Integrated Circuit, featured alongside the Sunset Highway VRM, for Intel SoC-based tablets.	Reference unknown.	2012
Crystal Forest	Platform	Intel's "next-generation communications platform," a scheme for network processing. Expected late in 2012.	Reference unknown.	2012
Cube Cove	Motherboard	Intel DQ45CB desktop motherboard. Micro-ATX form factor, Socket T (LGA775), Q45 chipset (Eaglelake).	Cube Cove, Alaska, USA.	2008
Culver City	Motherboard	Intel D925XCV desktop motherboard. ATX form factor, Socket T (LGA775), 925X chipset (Alderwood).	Culver City, California, USA.	2004
Culver City 2	Motherboard	Intel D925XECV2 desktop motherboard. ATX form factor, Socket T (LGA775), 925XE chipset (Alderwood).	Culver City, California, USA.	2004
Cumberland	Motherboard	Intel CU430HX motherboard. LPX form factor, Socket 7, 430HX chipset (Triton II).	Reference unknown.	1996
Cypress	Motherboard	Intel C440GX+ two-socket server motherboard. Server ATX form factor, Slot 2, 440GX chipset.	Reference unknown.	1999
Dakota	Motherboard	Intel DK440LX motherboard. Custom ATX form factor, Slot 1, 440LX chipset (Balboa).	Reference unknown.	1997
Dalhart	CPU	Intel PXA26x, a series of processors in the XScale family.	Reference unknown.	2003
Dana Point	Wireless	Wireless networking card for the Montevina platform supporting WiMAX.	Dana Point, a city in southern Orange County, California.	2007
Danbury	Encryption	Data protection engine in the Eaglelake chipsets. Part of the third generation of vPro (McCreary).	Reference unknown; see Danbury (disambiguation) for possibilities.	2007
Dandale	Motherboard	Intel DH57DD desktop motherboard. Micro-ATX form factor, LGA 1156, H57 chipset (Ibex Peak).	Reference unknown.	2010
Dayville	LAN adapter	Intel PRO/100 S desktop Ethernet adapter. Single-port, copper, 100 Mbit/s, PCI. Based on the 82551QM controller chip (Lavon).	Reference unknown.	2005
Decathlete	Motherboard	Specification for enterprise-ready two-socket motherboards based on the Xeon E5-2600 (Jaketown) processor and the C602 (Patsburg) chipset.	An athlete who participates in a decathlon.	2012
Deerfield	CPU	Itanium 2. Low-voltage version of Madison.	Reference unknown; see Deerfield (disambiguation) for possibilities.	1998
Deer Flat	Motherboard	Intel DP67DE desktop motherboard. Micro-ATX form factor, LGA 1155, P67 chipset (Cougar Point).	Reference unknown.	2011
Dempsey	CPU	Dual-Core Xeon 5000 series. Part of the 65 nm Cedar Mill family, and very similar to Presler.	Reference unknown. For various meanings see Dempsey.	2005
Denali	Memory controller	NAND controller built into the Moorestown platform.	Denali, in Denali National Park and Preserve, Alaska, USA. It is the highest peak in North America.	2009
Denverton	CPU	Intel Atom C3000 series SoC's based on the Goldmont microarchitecture.	Denverton, an unincorporated community in Solano County, California.	2017
Dermot	Motherboard	Intel D915PDT motherboard. Micro-ATX form factor, Socket T (LGA775), 915P chipset (Grantsdale).	Reference unknown.	2004
Deschutes	CPU	Second-generation Pentium II processor. 250 nm. Successor to Klamath.	Deschutes County, Oregon or, more likely, Deschutes River, which runs through it.	1998
Devil's Canyon	CPU	Codename for 4th gen/Haswell Refresh CPUs.	Reference unknown.	2013
Dewey Beach	LAN adapter	Intel PRO/1000 PT bypass server Ethernet adapter. Quad-port, copper, 1 Gbit/s, PCIe. Based on the 82571 (Ophir) controller chip.	Dewey Beach, Delaware, USA.	2006
Diamond Lake	Flash cache	Controller ASIC at the center of the Robson flash cache technology.	Diamond Lake, Oregon, USA.	2006
Diamondville	CPU	Atom 230, 330, N270, and N280 processors, aimed at low-cost applications. The 330 is dual-core, the others are single-core. The 230 and 330 are 64-bit, while the N270 and N280 are 32-bit. Part of the 45 nm Bonnell family.	Diamondville is a town in Lincoln County, Wyoming.	2007
Dimona	CPU	Itanium 9300 processor (Tukwila) with only two cores.	Dimona is an Israeli city in the Negev desert.	2004
Dixon	CPU	Celeron M and Mobile Pentium II PE ("Performance Enhanced"). 250 nm.	Reference unknown; see Dixon (disambiguation) for possibilities.	1998
Dodson	Motherboard	Intel SDS2 two-socket server motherboard. ATX form factor, Socket 370, ServerWorks ServerSet III HE-SL chipset.	Reference unknown.	2002
Dothan	CPU	Celeron M and Pentium M processor, successor to Banias. 90 nm.	Dothan, an ancient town in Israel liked by the Israeli design team. But also Dothan, AL. CPUs had to be named after cities listed on the map in the US.	2003
Double Barrow	LAN adapter	Intel PRO/1000 MT server Ethernet adapter. Dual-port, copper, 1 Gbit/s, PCI-X. Based on the 82546 (Anvik) controller chip.	Reference unknown.	2010
Doug Lake	Motherboard	Intel DH61DL desktop motherboard. Mini-ITX form factor, LGA 1155, H61 chipset (Cougar Point).	Reference unknown.	2011
Dover	LAN adapter	NetEffect Ethernet Server Cluster Adapter CX4. Single-port, copper, 10 Gbit/s, PCIe. Based on the NE020 chip.	City somewhere in the USA.	2009
Dowling-T	Chassis	Intel SR1500 1U rackmount server chassis.	Reference unknown.	2006
Downey	Motherboard	Intel D910GLDW desktop motherboard. Micro-ATX form factor, LGA 775, 910GL chipset (Grantsdale-GL).	Reference unknown.	2004
Dragontail Peak	Motherboard	Intel DP35DB desktop motherboard. ATX form factor, LGA 775, P35 chipset (Bearlake).	Dragontail Peak in the Alpine Lakes Wilderness, Washington, USA.	2007
Drake	CPU	Pentium II Xeon processor, the first Xeon. Based on the 250 nm Deschutes. Successor to the Pentium Pro.	Reference unknown.	1998
Driskill-T	Chassis	Intel SR2500 2U rackmount server chassis.	Reference unknown.	2006
Dry Fork	Motherboard	Intel DH77DF desktop motherboard. Mini-ITX form factor, LGA 1155, H77 chipset (Panther Point).	Reference unknown.	2012
Dublin	Motherboard	Intel DB440FX motherboard. LPX form factor, Slot 1, 440FX chipset (Natoma).	Capital of Ireland.	1997
Dunes Beach	Motherboard	Intel DZ68DB motherboard. ATX form factor, Socket H2 (LGA 1155), Z68 chipset (Cougar Point).	Reference unknown.	2011
Dunellen	Motherboard	Flex-ATX motherboard for the Timna SoC. Cancelled, as was Timna.	Dunellen, New Jersey, USA.	2000
Dunnington	CPU	Intel Xeon 7400 series, four or six cores. Based on the 45 nm Penryn. Successor to Tigerton.	Reference unknown; Dunnington is a village in Yorkshire, UK, but this is not a likely reference. Somewhere in the US there is a city by that name.	2005
Eaglelake	Chipset	Intel G41, G43, G45, P43, P45, Q43, and Q45 Express chipsets. The G and Q models have integrated GMA X4500 graphics. Successor to Bearlake.	Eagle Lake is the name of many places in North America, including a town in Texas.	2007
Eagle Ridge	Bus controller	Intel L123TA46 Thunderbolt controller chip. Copper, 2 channels, 10 Gbit/s. Essentially half of a Light Ridge.	Reference unknown.	2011
East Fork	Platform	Digital home PC platform, branded Viiv and combining a wide range of CPUs and chipsets.	Reference unknown; see East Fork for possibilities.	2005
Eastern Point	Motherboard	Intel DQ67EP desktop motherboard. Mini-ITX form factor, LGA 1155, Q67 chipset (Cougar Point).	Reference unknown.	2011
Easton	Motherboard	Intel D815EEA desktop motherboard. ATX form factor, Socket 370, 815E chipset (Solano).	Reference unknown.	2000
Eatonville	Motherboard	Intel D915GEV motherboard. ATX form factor, Socket T (LGA775), 915G chipset (Grantsdale-G).	Reference unknown.	2004
Eb Lake	Motherboard	Intel DH77EB desktop motherboard. Micro-ATX form factor, LGA 1155, H77 chipset (Panther Point).	Eb Lake in Winema National Forest, Oregon, USA.	2012
Echo Peak	WLAN controller	WiMAX/WiFi Link 5150 wireless networking card for the Montevina platform, supporting WiMAX and 802.11b/g/n.	Echo Peak, a mountain in the Sierra Nevada mountain range to the west of Lake Tahoe on the border of the Desolation Wilderness in El Dorado County, California.	2007
Eden Prairie	Motherboard	Intel SE7320EP2 two-socket server motherboard. ATX form factor, Socket 604, E7320 chipset (Lindenhurst).	Eden Prairie, Minnesota, USA.	2005
Eklo	Motherboard	Intel DQ45EK desktop motherboard. Mini-ITX form factor, LGA 775, Q45 chipset (Eaglelake).	Reference unknown.	2008
Ekron	LAN controller	Intel 82562 series Ethernet PHY. Single-port, 100 Mbit/s, 350 nm.	May be a reference to the biblical Philistine city of Ekron	2005
Eldridge	LAN adapter	Intel PRO/1000 MF server Ethernet adapter. Dual-port, fiber, 1 Gbit/s, PCI-X. Based on the 82546 (Anvik) controller chip.	Reference unknown.	2003
Elmcrest	SSD	Intel 510 series solid-state drives, 34 nm MLC, SATA 6 Gbit/s.	Reference unknown.	2011
Emerald Bay	Motherboard	Intel EB440BX motherboard. Uses the 440BX chipset.	Emerald Bay is a bay on the west side of Lake Tahoe, in California.	
Emerald Lake	Motherboard	Customer reference board for the Huron River platform.	Emerald Lake is located in Yoho National Park, British Columbia.	2009
Emerald Lake 2	Motherboard	Customer reference board for the Chief River platform.	Emerald Lake is located in Yoho National Park, British Columbia.	2011
Endeavor	Motherboard	Intel Advanced/EV motherboard. Baby-AT form factor, Socket 7, 430FX chipset (Triton).	Reference unknown.	1996
Englewood	Motherboard	Intel D815EGEW desktop motherboard. MicroATX form factor, Socket 370, 815EG chipset (Solano).	Reference unknown.	2001
Entrada	Motherboard	Intel Classis/PCI LP motherboard. LPX form factor, Socket 3, 420EX chipset (Aries).	Reference unknown.	
Ephraim	SSD	Intel X25-E, X25-M, and X18-M solid-state drives, 50 nm SLC and MLC, SATA 3 Gbit/s.	Ephraim, the biblical figure.	2008
Eva Cove	Motherboard	Intel DG35EC desktop motherboard. MicroATX form factor, LGA 775, G35 chipset (Bearlake).	Reference unknown.	2008
Evans Peak	WLAN controller	Wireless networking module for the Moorestown platform supporting WiMAX, Wi-Fi, and GPS.	Reference unknown. There are multiple Evans Peaks in the USA.	2008
Everson	LAN adapter	Intel PRO/1000 MT server Ethernet adapter. Single-port, copper, 1 Gbit/s, PCI-X. Based on the 82545 (Attla) controller chip.	Reference unknown.	2003
Fairbanks	Motherboard	Intel FB820 motherboard. NLX form factor, i820 chipset (Camino).	Fairbanks, Alaska, USA.	1999
Fair Oaks	Motherboard	Intel BP660 motherboard. Socket 7.	Reference unknown.	
Falcon Mountain	Fiber chipset	Intel 10G PON Chipset (now MaxLinear)	Reference unknown.	2018
Fanwood	CPU	Itanium 2, the fourth-generation Itanium (but still called Itanium 2). 130 nm. Successor to Madison.	Possibly Fanwood, a borough in the US state of New Jersey.	2004
Fayetteville	Motherboard	Intel D815EFV desktop motherboard. MicroATX form factor, Socket 370, 815E chipset (Solano).	Reference unknown.	2001
Fiji	Motherboard	Intel FJ440ZX motherboard. MicroATX form factor, Socket 370, 440ZX chipset.	Fiji, an island nation in the South Pacific.	
Flaxton	Motherboard	Intel DQ963FX desktop motherboard. ATX form factor, LGA 775, Q963 chipset (Broadwater).	Reference unknown.	2006
Fly Creek	Motherboard	Intel DG45FC desktop motherboard. Mini-ITX form factor, LGA 775, G45 chipset (Eaglelake).	Reference unknown.	2008
Forest Lake	I/O bridge	Intel 80314 I/O companion chip.	Reference unknown.	2004
Fort Sumter	Motherboard	Customer reference board for the Calpella platform.	Fort Sumter, Charleston, South Carolina, USA, where the first shots in the American Civil War were fired.	2009
Fortville	LAN adapter	Intel Rack Scale Architecture Switching Ethernet NIC chip.	Possibly named after Fortville, a town in Indiana.	2013
Foster	CPU	First Xeon processor to use the NetBurst microarchitecture. Based on the 180 nm Willamette. Successor to Cascades.	Reference unknown; see Foster (disambiguation) for possibilities.	1998
Foxhollow	Platform	Workstation and entry-level server platform combining the Xeon 3400 series (Clarkdale and Lynnfield) CPUs with the 3450 (Ibex Peak) chipset.	Reference unknown.	2007
Foxton	Technology	Power-management technology intended for inclusion in Montecito. Cancelled.	Reference unknown; see Foxton (disambiguation) for possibilities.	2005
Fox Cove	Server	Intel S7000FC4UR four-socket 4U rackmount server system. Socket 604 × 4, 7300 chipset (Clarksboro).	Reference unknown.	2007
Free Town	Motherboard	Intel D845GVFN motherboard. Micro-ATX form factor, Socket 478, 845GV chipset (Brookdale-GV).	Reference unknown; see Freetown (disambiguation) for possibilities.	2004
Frostburg	Motherboard	Intel DG33FB desktop motherboard. ATX form factor, LGA 775, G33 chipset (Bearlake).	Reference unknown.	2007
Gainestown	CPU	Xeon 5500 series CPUs, dual-core and quad-core. Part of the 45 nm Nehalem family. Also called Nehalem-EP.	Probably named after Gainestown, Alabama.	2007
Gainesville	LAN adapter	Intel PRO/1000 S server Ethernet adapter. Dual-port, copper, 1 Gbit/s, PCI. Based on the 82550PM (Moab) controller chip.	Reference unknown.	2002
Gallatin	CPU	Pentium 4 Extreme Edition, and also the successor to Prestonia in the Xeon line. Based on the 130 nm Northwood.	Reference unknown; see Gallatin (disambiguation) for possibilities.	2000
Gallaway	Platform	Single-socket workstation platform combining the Pentium D (Smithfield and Presler) CPUs and the Pentium 4 (Prescott 2M and Cedar Mill) CPUs with the 955X (Glenwood) chipset.	Probably named after Gallaway, California.	2005
Gamla	LAN controller	Intel 82550EY Ethernet controller.	Gamla, an ancient city in the Golan Heights.	1999
Gardendale	Motherboard	Intel DH67GD desktop motherboard. Micro-ATX form factor, LGA 1155, H67 chipset (Cougar Point).	Reference unknown.	2011
Garibaldi	Motherboard	Intel D850GB desktop motherboard. ATX form factor, Socket 423, 850 chipset (Tehama).	Reference unknown.	2001
Garden Island	Server	Intel SR1695WBAC and SR1695WBDC 1U rackmount servers.	Reference unknown.	2010
Garlow	Platform	Single-socket desktop platform combining the Core 2 Extreme (Yorkfield) CPU with the X38 (Bearlake) chipset. Successor to Wyloway.	Reference unknown.	2007
Gasper	Motherboard	Intel DZ77GA70K desktop motherboard. ATX form factor, LGA 1155, Z77 chipset (Panther Point).	Reference unknown.	2012
Gaston	WLAN core	Intel wireless technology, part of the Napa platform.	Gaston is a city in Washington County, Oregon, USA.	2004
Geneseo	Technology	Extensions to PCI Express for connecting to co-processors. Developed jointly by Intel and IBM.	Reference unknown; see Geneseo (disambiguation) for possibilities.	2006
Gesher	CPU architecture	A processor microarchitecture, the successor to Nehalem. Renamed to Sandy Bridge after it was discovered that Gesher is also the name of a political party in Israel.	The Hebrew word for 'bridge'.	2011
Gilgal	LAN controller	Intel 82564EB Ethernet PHY. Single-port, 1 Gbit/s, 150 nm.	Gilgal is a place mentioned in the Hebrew Bible.	2006
Gilo	CPU	Mobile processor based on the 45 nm Nehalem microarchitecture. Possibly cancelled or renamed.	Probably named after Mount Gilo, a mountain close to Jerusalem; see Har Gilo.	2003
Glen Brook	SSD	Intel X25-V solid-state drive, 34 nm MLC, SATA 3 Gbit/s.	Reference unknown.	2009
Glen Ridge	Motherboard	Intel D915PGN motherboard. ATX form factor, Socket T (LGA775), 915P chipset (Grantsdale).	Reference unknown.	2004
Glenwood	Chipset	Intel 975X Express chipset.	Reference unknown; see Glenwood (disambiguation) for possibilities.	2004
Glidewell	Platform	Workstation counterpart of the Bensley server platform, combining the Xeon 5000 (Dempsey) CPU with the 5000X (Greencreek) chipset.	Reference unknown.	2005
Glyndon	LAN adapter	Intel PRO/1000 PT server Ethernet adapter. Single-port, copper, 1 Gbit/s, PCIe. Based on the 82572 (Rimon) controller chip.	Reference unknown.	2006
Gracemont	Microarchitecture	E-Core of Alder Lake microprocessor	Gracemont, Oklahoma	2021
Golan	WLAN controller	Intel PRO/Wireless 3945ABG mini-PCIe Wi-Fi adapter, part of the Napa platform.	Golan, a city mentioned in the Hebrew Bible.	2005
Golden Cove	Microarchitecture	P-Core of Alder Lake microprocessor	Reference unknown.	2021
Grand County	Motherboard	Intel D101GGC motherboard. Micro-ATX form factor, Socket T (LGA775), ATI Radeon Xpress 200 chipset.	Reference unknown.	2005
Granite Bay	Chipset	Intel E7205 chipset for workstations. Used with Pentium 4 CPUs.	Granite Bay, a census-designated place in Placer County, California.	2001
Grantley-EP	Platform	Two-socket server platform combining the Haswell-EP or Broadwell-EP processor with the Wellsburg chipset.	Reference unknown.	2012
Grantsdale	Chipset	Intel 910GL, 915G, 915GL, 915GV, 915P, and 915PL chipsets. Used with Pentium 4 (Northwood) and Pentium D (Smithfield) CPUs. Successor to Springdale.	Reference unknown; may be named after Grantsdale, Montana.	2004
Green Fountain	LAN adapter	Intel XF SR server Ethernet adapter. Dual-port, fiber, 10 Gbit/s, PCIe 2.0. Based on the 82598EB (Oplin) controller chip.	Reference unknown.	2007
Greencreek	Chipset	Intel 5000X chipset. Used with the Xeon 5000, 5100, 5200, 5300, and 5400 series CPUs (Dempsey, Woodcrest, Wolfdale, Clovertown, and Harpertown).	Greencreek is the name of a town in Idaho County, Idaho, USA. See List of places in Idaho.	2004
Grizzly Pass	Motherboard	Intel S2600GL and S2600GZ two-socket motherboards, intended for rackmount servers. Custom form factor, C600 chipset (Patsburg), Socket R (LGA 2011). Supports the Xeon E5-2600 series CPU (Jaketown).	Probably Grizzly Pass in Yosemite National Park.	2011
Grosse Point	Motherboard	Intel S3420GP series server motherboards. ATX form factor, 3420 chipset (Ibex Peak), Socket H (LGA 1156). Supports Xeon 3400 series processors (Lynnfield). Grosse Point is also the codename of server systems based on this motherboard.	Possibly Grosse Pointe, Michigan, made famous in the movie Grosse Pointe Blank	2009
Groveland	SoC	Intel CE4200 family of processors	Reference unknown; see Groveland (disambiguation) for possibilities.	2010
Guardfish	Motherboard	Intel DQ965GF desktop motherboard. Micro-ATX form factor, Socket T (LGA775), Q965 chipset (Broadwater).	Reference unknown.	2006
Gulftown	CPU	Core i7-970, i7-980X, and i7-990X Extreme Edition CPUs, and the Xeon W3690 CPU, all with six cores. Part of the 32 nm Westmere family.	Reference unknown.	2009
Hammonton	Motherboard	Intel D915GHA motherboard. Micro-ATX form factor, Socket T (LGA775), 915G chipset (Grantsdale-G).	Reference unknown.	2004
Hanksville	LAN controller	Intel 82578 series Ethernet PHY. Single-port, 1 Gbit/s, 90 nm.	Hanksville, Utah, USA.	2009
Hanlan Creek	Motherboard	Intel S5520HC, S5500HCV, and S5520HCT two-socket server motherboards. SSI EEB form factor, Socket B (LGA1366), 5500 or 5520 chipset (Tylersburg). Supports Xeon 5500 and 5600 processors (Gainestown and Westmere-EP).	Reference unknown.	2008
Harpertown	CPU	Xeon 5400 series. Quad-core. Part of the 45 nm Penryn family.	Harpertown, a place in Kern County, California.	2007
Hartwell	LAN controller	Intel 82574 series Ethernet controllers. Single-port, 1 Gbit/s, PCIe 1.1, 90 nm.	Reference unknown.	2008
Haswell	CPU architecture	Successor to the Sandy Bridge microarchitecture, using the same 22 nm process as Ivy Bridge. Arrived in 2013. Abbreviated HSW.	Haswell, Colorado.	2013
Havendale	CPU	Desktop processor in the 45 nm Nehalem family, essentially Lynnfield with two cores instead of four. Canceled in favor of the 32 nm Westmere-based Clarkdale.	Reference unknown.	2008
Havre	Motherboard	Intel D845HV motherboard. Micro-ATX form factor, Socket 478, 845 chipset (Brookdale).	Reference unknown.	2001
Hawley Creek	Flash cache	Intel 313 SSD cache, 25 nm SLC NAND, SATA 3 Gbit/s. Successor to Larson Creek.	Reference unknown.	2011
Hayden Valley	Motherboard	Intel S5500HV and S5500HCV two-socket server motherboards. SSI EEB (S5500HCV) or custom half-width (S5500HV) form factor, 2 × LGA 1366, 5500 chipset (Tylersburg). Also the SR1670HV server system.	Reference unknown.	2009
Hazleton	Motherboard	Intel D865GVHZ motherboard. Micro-ATX form factor, Socket 478, 865GV chipset (Springdale-GV).	Reference unknown.	2004
Hendrixx	Motherboard	Intel Premiere/ATLX motherboard. Baby-AT form factor, Socket 4, 430LX chipset (Mercury).	The musician Jimi Hendrix.	
Hillel	CPU	The CPU portion of the Clarkdale and Arrandale processors. Part of the 32 nm Westmere family.	Reference unknown; see Hillel (disambiguation) for possibilities.	2009
Hondo	CPU	Itanium 2 mx2. Combines two Madison dies in a single package.	Possibly Hondo, the county seat of Medina County, Texas, USA.	2004
Horse Creek	Platform	SiFive P550 highest performance RISC-V processor on 7 nm combined with Intel's leading-edge interface IP such as DDR and PCIe.	Probably Horse Creek, California	2021
Houlton Legacy	Motherboard	Intel D2500HN desktop motherboard. Mini-ITX form factor, Atom D2500 processor (Cedarview), NM10 chipset (Tiger Point).	Reference unknown.	2011
Huron River	Platform	Seventh-generation Centrino, a mobile platform combining the Sandy Bridge CPU with the HM65, HM67, QM67, QS67, and UM67 (Cougar Point) chipsets. Successor to Calpella.	A large river in the state of Michigan.	2010
Ibex Peak	Chipset	Intel H55, P55, H57, Q57 Express chipsets, HM55, PM55, HM57, QM57, QS57 Mobile Express chipsets, and the 3400 series chipsets for single-socket servers and workstations. First Intel chipset to use a PCH.	A summit in Inyo County, California, USA.	2008
Ice Lake	CPU architecture	Intel's 2nd generation microarchitecture based on the 10 nm node, expected to replace Cannon Lake.	Ice Lake, a body of water in the state of Oregon	2020
Iron Falls	Motherboard	Intel D915GRF motherboard. ATX form factor, Socket T (LGA775), 915G chipset (Grantsdale-G).	Reference unknown.	2004
Ironlake	GMCH	Graphics controller and memory controller hub (GMCH) in a single 45 nm die. Packaged with the Hillel CPU to form the Clarkdale and Arrandale processors.	Reference unknown.	2009
Iron Pass	Motherboard	Intel S2600IP4 two-socket server motherboard. Custom form factor, Socket R (LGA 2011), C600 chipset (Patsburg). Supports the Xeon E5-2600 CPU.	Reference unknown.	2011
Iron Pond	LAN adapter	Intel X520-T2 server Ethernet adapter. Dual-port, copper, 10 Gbit/s, PCIe 2.0. Based on the 82599EB (Niantic) controller chip.	Reference unknown.	2010
Irwindale	CPU	Xeon processor based on the 64-bit, 90 nm Prescott. Much like Nocona but with 2MB cache instead of 1 MB, and capable of reducing its clock speed when idle.	Irwindale, a city in Los Angeles County, California.	2004
Ivy Bridge	CPU architecture	Die shrink of Sandy Bridge from 32 nm to 22 nm, with minor architectural improvements and faster graphics. First product to use Intel's tri-gate transistors. Abbreviated IVB.	Reference Possibly Pontivy, Brittany, France.	2012
Jaketown	CPU	Xeon E5-2600 series CPUs, aimed at dual-socket servers. Also code-named Sandy Bridge-EP. Part of the 32 nm Sandy Bridge family.	Reference unknown.	2010
Jackson	Technology	Hyper-threading technology, Intel's term for simultaneous multithreading, introduced in the Foster MP Xeon processor.	Possibly Jackson, Mississippi, or US president Andrew Jackson.	2001
Ivytown	CPU	Xeon E7 series CPUs, aimed at dual-socket servers. Also code-named Ivy Bridge-EX. Part of the 22 nm Intel Ivy Bridge|Ivy Bridge] family.	Reference unknown.	2013
Jasper Forest	CPU	Xeon LC3500 series (dual-core), Xeon LC5500 series (quad-core), and the Celeron P1053 (single-core), intended for use in storage controllers paired with the 3420 (Ibex Peak) chipset. Part of the 45 nm Nehalem family.	Reference unknown.	2009
Jayhawk	CPU	Xeon counterpart of Tejas. Cancelled, as was Tejas.	Reference unknown; see Jayhawk (disambiguation) for possibilities.	2003
Jefferson Pass	Motherboard	Intel S2600JF and S2600JFQ two-socket half-width rackmount server motherboards. Custom form factor, Socket R (LGA 2011), C600 chipset (Patsburg). Supports the Xeon E5-2600 processor (Jaketown).	Reference unknown.	2011
Johannesburg	Motherboard	Intel DQ35JO desktop motherboard. Micro-ATX form factor, Socket T (LGA775), Q35 chipset (Bearlake).	Johannesburg, South Africa.	2007
Johnstown	Motherboard	Intel D945GSEJT motherboard. Mini-ITX form factor, soldered Atom N270 processor (Diamondville), 945GSE chipset (Calistoga).	Reference unknown.	2009
Jones Beach	LAN adapter	Intel PRO/1000 PF bypass server Ethernet adapter. Quad-port, fiber, 1 Gbit/s, PCIe. Based on the 82571 GB controller chip (Ophir).	Jones Beach State Park, New York	2006
Jordan Creek	Memory buffer	Memory buffer to accompany the Ivy Bridge-EX and Haswell-EX processors in the Brickland server platform.	Reference unknown.	2012
Juneau	Motherboard	Intel JN440BX motherboard. Based on the 440BX chipset.	Juneau is the capital of the U.S. state of Alaska.	1998
Kaby Lake	CPU architecture	Successor to the Skylake microarchitecture, using the same 14 nm process. Abbreviated KBL.	Kaby Lake is the shortened name for Kabinakagami Lake, a large lake approximately 70 miles north of Wawa, Ontario.	2016
Katmai	CPU	First-generation Pentium III processor, 250 nm. Successor to Deschutes.	Probably named after Mount Katmai, a volcano in the Katmai Park in Alaska, the site of a colossal 1912 eruption. Incidentally, Katmai is also the codename of a Microsoft product, SQL Server 2008.	1998
Kauai	Motherboard	Intel KU440EX motherboard. Based on the 440EX chipset.	Kauai, the oldest of the main Hawaiian Islands.	1998
Kawela	LAN controller	Intel 82576 series Ethernet controllers. Dual-port, 1 Gbit/s, PCIe 2.0, 90 nm.	Kawela Bay on the Hawaiian Island of Oahu.	2009
Kaylo	Platform	Business desktop platform combining the Xeon 3000 series (Conroe, Wolfdale, Kentsfield) CPUs with the 3010 (Mukilteo 2) chipset.	Reference unknown.	2007
Kedron	WLAN controller	Intel PRO/Wireless 4965AGN, an IEEE 802.11 a/b/g/n mini-PCIe Wi-Fi adapter. Part of the Santa Rosa platform.	Reference unknown; see Kedron (disambiguation) for possibilities.	2006
Keifer	CPU	A 32-core CPU based on a mini-core. Cancelled.	Kiefer is Yiddish for "pine tree" and a Jewish surname.	2006
Kenai	LAN controller	Intel 82540EP and 82540EM (Kenai 32) and 82545EM (Kenai 64) integrated Ethernet controllers. Single port, 1 Gbit/s, 150 nm.	Reference unknown; see Kenai (disambiguation) for possibilities.	2002
Kenosha Pass	Motherboard	Intel S1200KP server motherboard. Mini-ITX form factor, C206 chipset (Cougar Point). Supports the Xeon E3-1200 processor (Sandy Bridge-EN).	Kenosha Pass is a high mountain pass located in the Rocky Mountains of central Colorado in the United States.	2011
Kentsfield	CPU	Core 2 Quad Q6600 and Q6700, Core 2 Extreme QX6700, QX6800, and QX6850, and the Xeon 3200 series. Has two dual-core dies in a single package for a total of four cores. Part of the 65 nm Conroe family.	Reference unknown.	2005
Kevet	CPU	Massively multi-core CPU based on mini-cores. Cancelled.	A place in Ventura County, California.	2006
Kikayon	CPU	Test version of the Yonah processor, never commercialized.	Kikayon is the Hebrew name of a plant mentioned in the Biblical Book of Jonah.	2006
King Crest	SSD	Solid-state drive in the 500 series. 2.5-inch form factor, 25 nm HET-MLC, SATA, 6 Gbit/s. Successor to Cherryville.	Reference unknown.	2011
Kings Creek	Platform	Mainstream and performance desktop platform combining the Xeon 3400 series (Lynnfield and Clarkdale) CPUs with the P55 (Ibex Peak) chipset.	Kings Creek, a creek at Lassen Peak, California.	2008
Kingsport 3	LAN adapter	Intel PRO/1000 GT server Ethernet adapter. Quad-port, copper, 1 Gbit/s, PCI-X. Based on the 82546 (Anvik) controller chip.	Reference unknown.	2006
Kinnereth	LAN controller	Intel 82562 series Ethernet PHY chips. Single port, 100 Mbit/s, 350 nm.	Yam Kinneret, Israel's largest freshwater lake.	2000
Kinston	Motherboard	Intel D425KT desktop motherboard. Mini-ITX form factor, Atom D425 processor (Pineview), NM10 chipset (Tiger Point).	Reference unknown.	2010
Kirkwood	LAN adapter	Intel PRO/1000 PT server Ethernet adapter. Quad-port, copper, 1 Gbit/s, PCIe. Based on the 82571 (Ophir) controller chip.	Reference unknown.	2006
Kittson	CPU	Ninth-generation Itanium processor, expected in 2014. Successor to Poulson.	Possibly named after Kittson County, Minnesota.	2007
Klamath	CPU	First-generation Pentium II processor. 350 nm. Successor to the Pentium Pro.	The Klamath River, which flows through Oregon and California and is the name of adjacent counties in both of these states.	1997
Knights Corner	Co-processor	Xeon Phi, a "many integrated core" (MIC) processor based on the Larrabee core and having 50 or more cores. Aimed at the high-performance computing segment. 22 nm.	Reference unknown.	2011
Knights Ferry	Co-processor	Experimental parallel co-processor built around the 32-core Aubrey Isle MIC processor. Attaches via PCIe and resembles a graphics card.	Knights Ferry, California, USA.	2010
Knights Hill	CPU	Cancelled successor to Knights Landing, intended to be built on a 10 nm architecture.	Reference unknown.	2014
Knights Landing	CPU/Co-processor	Successor to Knights Corner in the Xeon Phi line.	Knights Landing, California, USA.	2013
Knights Mill	CPU	Successor to Knights Landing, designed specifically for the acceleration of artificial intelligence workloads.	Reference unknown.	2017
Knoll Creek	Motherboard	Intel DH77KC desktop motherboard. ATX form factor, LGA 1155, H77 chipset (Panther Point).	Reference unknown.	2012
Kyrene	Chipset	Intended as the successor to Brookdale, but never released.	Kyrene is a settlement in the state of Arizona.	2002
L52A	Flash memory	2GB MLC NAND flash memory chip, 50 nm. Developed jointly with Micron Corp.	Follows Micron naming convention.	
L62A	Flash memory	2GB MLC NAND flash memory chip, 34 nm. Developed jointly with Micron Corp.	Follows Micron naming convention.	
L63A	Flash memory	4GB MLC NAND flash memory chip, 34 nm. Developed jointly with Micron Corp.	Follows Micron naming convention.	
L63B	Flash memory	4GB MLC NAND flash memory chip, 34 nm. Developed jointly with Micron Corp.	Follows Micron naming convention.	
L73A	Flash memory	4/8GB MLC NAND flash memory chip, 25 nm. Developed jointly with Micron Corp.	Follows Micron naming convention.	
L74A	Flash memory	8/16/32GB MLC NAND flash memory chip, 25 nm. Developed jointly with Micron Corp.	Follows Micron naming convention.	
L84A	Flash memory	8GB MLC NAND flash memory chip, 20 nm. Developed jointly with Micron Corp.	Follows Micron naming convention.	
La Crosse	Motherboard	Intel D865GLC motherboard. Micro-ATX form factor, Socket 478, 865G chipset (Springdale).	Reference unknown.	2003
LaGrande	Technology	Intel Trusted Execution Technology, a set of security features.	La Grande is a city in Union County, Oregon, USA.	2002
La Mesa	Motherboard	Intel D945PLM motherboard. Micro-ATX form factor, Socket T (LGA775), 945P chipset (Lakeport).	Reference unknown.	2005
Lakeport	Chipset	Intel 945G, 945GC, 945GZ, 945P, 945PL, 946GZ, 946PL, and 955X chipsets. The G models have integrated GMA 950 graphics.	Reference unknown; see Lakeport (disambiguation) for possibilities.	2005
Langwell	Chipset	PCH for the Moorestown system-on-a-chip platform for UMPCs and tablets. Manufactured for Intel by TSMC.	Reference unknown.	2007
Larrabee	CPU architecture	GPGPU built around a simplified x86 core (a mini-core). Originally intended as a stand-alone graphics product, but now relegated to HPC research projects.	Reference unknown; see Larrabee (disambiguation) for possibilities.	2006
Larson Creek	Flash cache	Intel 311 SSD cache, 34 nm SLC, SATA 3 Gbit/s. Also spelled Larsen Creek.	Reference unknown.	2011
Lavon	LAN controller	Intel 82551 series Ethernet controllers. Single-port, 100 Mbit/s, PCI, 350 nm.	Reference unknown.	2002
Layton	Motherboard	Intel D845GLLY motherboard. Micro-ATX form factor, Socket 478, 845GL chipset (Brookdale-GL).	Reference unknown.	2002
Lewisville	LAN controller	Intel 82579 series Ethernet PHY chips. Single-port, 1 Gbit/s, 90 nm.	Reference unknown.	2010
Lewisburg	Chipset	PCH for two- and four-socket servers based on the Purley platform. Successor to Wellsburg.	Reference unknown.	2016
Light Peak	Technology	Thunderbolt, a general-purpose serial interconnect with speeds of at least 10 Gbit/s. Originally intended to be fiber-based, but the first versions use copper.	Reference unknown.	2009
Light Ridge	Bus controller	Intel L051NB32 Thunderbolt controller chip. Copper, 4 channels, 10 Gbit/s.	Reference unknown.	2011
Lincoln Crest	SSD	Solid-state drive in the 300 series. 2.5-inch form factor, SATA, 6 Gbit/s.	Reference unknown.	2011
Lincroft	CPU	Atom Z600 series processors, intended for tablet computers. Part of the 45 nm Bonnell family.	Lincroft is a part of Middletown Township, in Monmouth County, New Jersey.	2008
Lindenhurst	Chipset	Intel E7320 and E7520 chipsets, used in two-socket servers primarily with Xeon CPUs in the 90 nm Prescott family (Cranford, Irwindale, Nocona, and Potomac). Also the codename of a platform combining these components.	Reference unknown; see Lindenhurst (disambiguation) for possibilities.	2003
Little Falls	Motherboard	Intel D945GCLF motherboard. Mini-ITX form factor, soldered Atom 230 processor (Diamondville), 945GC chipset (Lakeport-GC).	Reference unknown.	2008
Little Falls 2	Motherboard	Intel D945GCLF2 motherboard. Mini-ITX form factor, soldered Atom 330 dual-core processor (Diamondville), 945GC chipset (Lakeport-GC).	Reference unknown.	2008
Little River	Chipset	Intel 945GU Express chipset, an MCH with integrated GMA 500 graphics. Used with the A100 and A110 (Stealey) CPUs in the McCaslin MID platform.	Reference unknown; see Little River (disambiguation) for possibilities.	2007
Liven Good	LAN controller	Intel 82543GC Ethernet controller. Single-port, 1 Gbit/s, 350 nm.	Reference unknown. Possibly a play on the name of Intel researcher Richard Livengood, or reference to Livengood, Alaska	2000
Lizard Head Pass	Motherboard	Intel S4600L four-socket motherboards, aimed at rack servers. Custom 16.7” x 20” form factor, Socket R (LGA 2011), C602 is one of the Intel Xeon chipsets (Patsburg). Supports the Xeon E5-4600 CPU (Sandy Bridge-EP).	Reference unknown.	2013
Long Cove	LAN adapter	Intel AF DA server Ethernet adapter. Dual-port, copper, 10 Gbit/s, PCIe 2.0. Based on the 82598EB (Oplin) controller chip.	Reference unknown.	2008
Lordship Beach	Debug card	Intel Bay Lake CRB POST/debug add-in card.	Reference unknown.	2012
Lunar Lake	Microprocessor	Intel Core Ultra 2nd generation mobile processors	Lunar Lake, NV	2024
Lunaville	LAN adapter	Intel EF server Ethernet adapter. Dual-port, fiber, 1 Gbit/s, PCIe 2.0. Based on the 82576EB (Kawela) controller chip.	Reference unknown.	2008
Luxemburg	Motherboard	Intel D915GUX motherboard. Micro-ATX form factor, Socket T (LGA775), 915G chipset (Grantsdale-G).	Reference unknown.	2004
Lyndonville	SSD	Intel 710 series solid-state drives, 25 nm MLC, SATA 3 Gbit/s.	Reference unknown.	2009
Lynnfield	CPU	Core i5-700 series, Core i7-800 series, and Xeon 3400 series, all quad-core. Part of the 45 nm Nehalem family.	Lynnfield, Massachusetts.	2007
MacKenzie	LAN adapter	Intel PRO/100 M desktop Ethernet adapter. Single-port, copper, 100 Mbit/s, PCI. Based on the 82550EY controller chip (Gamla).	Reference unknown.	2002
Madison	CPU	Itanium 2, the third-generation Itanium (but still called Itanium 2). 130 nm. Successor to McKinley.	Probably Madison, Wisconsin, or US president James Madison.	1998
Maho Bay	Platform	Desktop platform combining the Ivy Bridge CPU with the 7 series (Panther Point) chipsets.	Maho Bay in the Virgin Islands.	2011
Maple Crest	SSD	Intel 330 series solid-state drives. 25 nm MLC, SATA 6.0 Gbit/s. Successor to Postville.	Reference unknown.	2012
Marathon	GPU	Intel 2700G graphics accelerator. Companion to the PXA270 series (Bulverde) XScale processors.	Marathon, Greece, for which the long-distance race is named.	2004
Marblehead	Motherboard	Intel D915GMH motherboard. Micro-BTX form factor, Socket T (LGA775), 915G chipset (Grantsdale-G).	Likely Marblehead, Massachusetts.	2004
Marlinspike	Motherboard	Intel MS440GX workstation motherboard. Custom ATX form factor, two Slot 2 sockets, 440GX chipset.	Reference unknown.	1998
Mars	Chipset	Intel 450KX chipset, intended for two-socket Pentium Pro systems.	The planet Mars.	1995
Marshalltown	Motherboard	Intel DN2800MT and DN2800MTE desktop motherboards. Mini-ITX form factor, Atom N2800 processor (Cedarview), NM10 chipset (Tiger Point).	Reference unknown.	2012
Matanzas	Motherboard	Reference design for an embedded version of the Santa Rosa mobile platform, using a Merom-based CPU and the Crestline chipset.	Matanzas is the capital of the Cuban province of Matanzas.	2006
Maui	Motherboard	MU440EX mATX motherboard with the 440EX chipset and on-board ATi Rage Pro (AGP)	Hawaiian island	1998
Maywood	Motherboard	Intel D845PEMY motherboard. Micro-ATX form factor, Socket 478, 845PE chipset (Brookdale-PE).	Reference unknown.	2004
McCaslin	Platform	Mobile Internet platform combining the A100 series (Stealey) CPUs with the 945GU (Little River) chipset.	Reference unknown.	2007
McCreary	Platform	Third generation of vPro, a managed desktop platform combining the Core 2 Duo and Quad (Wolfdale and Yorkfield) CPUs with the Q45 (Eaglelake) chipset.	Possibly named after McCreary County, Kentucky.	2007
McKinley	CPU	Itanium 2, the second-generation Itanium. 180 nm. Successor to Merced.	Denali (formerly Mount McKinley) in Alaska is the highest mountain peak in North America.	1998
Medfield	SoC	Atom Z2000, Z2460, and Z2580 processors, aimed at smartphones and tablets. The Z2580 is dual-core, the others are single core. Part of the 32 nm Saltwell family. Successor to Moorestown.	Possibly named after Medfield, Massachusetts.	2009
Mendocino	CPU	The second-generation Celeron processor. Successor to Covington, and essentially that CPU with L2 cache added, and much faster as a result.	Mendocino County, California	1998
Menlow	Platform	Mobile Internet device (MID) platform combining the Atom Z500 series (Silverthorne) CPU, the US15 series (Poulsbo) chipsets, and optionally the Connection 2400 WiMax chip (Baxter Peak).	Reference unknown.	2007
Merced	CPU	The first version of the Itanium processor.	Merced River or Lake Merced, California.	1998
Mercury	Chipset	Intel 430LX chipset, used with first-generation Pentium CPUs.	The planet Mercury.	1993
Merom	CPU	Mobile processors in the 65 nm Conroe family, sold as Celeron M, Celeron Mobile, Core 2 Solo, Core 2 Duo Mobile, Core 2 Extreme Mobile, and Pentium Mobile. Successor to Yonah.	Lake Merom in the Hula Valley of Israel.	2003
Merrifield	SoC	A future Atom processor in the 22 nm Silvermont family. Aimed at high-end smartphones. Successor to Medfield.	Reference unknown.	2012
Meteor Lake	Microprocessor	Intel Core Ultra 1st generation mobile processors	Meteor Lake, CA	2023
Millbrook	Memory buffer	Intel 7500, 7510, and 7512 scalable memory buffers.	Reference unknown.	2009
Millington	CPU	Low-voltage version of the Itanium 2 9000 (Montecito) CPU.	Reference unknown; see Millington (disambiguation) for possibilities.	2004
Millville	CPU	Single-core processor with 1 MB cache in the 65 nm Conroe family, basically half of an Allendale.	Reference unknown; see Millville (disambiguation) for possibilities.	2005
Moab	LAN controller	Intel 82550PM Ethernet controller.	Moab, an ancient kingdom in modern-day Jordan that was often in conflict with Israel in Biblical times.	1999
Mobile Bay	RAID controller	Intel RS2 MB044 RAID controller. SAS/SATA, 6 Gbit/s, 4 internal and 4 external ports, PCIe 2.0.	Mobile Bay, Alabama, USA.	2010
Monahans	CPU	The PXA300 family of XScale processors. Successor to Bulverde.	Monahans, a city in Texas; the county seat of Ward County.	2005
Montara	Chipset	Intel 852 and 855 series mobile chipsets, used with Pentium 4 CPUs.	Montara, a census-designated place in San Mateo County, California.	2002
Montecito	CPU	Itanium 2 9000, the fifth-generation Itanium. Dual-core, 90 nm. Successor to Fanwood.	Montecito, California.	2002
Montevina	Platform	Fifth-generation Centrino, called Centrino 2, a mobile platform combining the Core 2 Duo (Penryn) CPU with the GL40, GS45, GM45, and PM45 (Cantiga) chipsets. Successor to Santa Rosa.	Montevina is a wine out of the Sierra Foothills, after the Italian word for mountain wine.	2007
Montpelier	Motherboard	Intel DQ35MP motherboard. Micro-ATX form factor, Socket T (LGA775), Q35 chipset (Bearlake-Q).	Probably Montpelier, Vermont.	2007
Montvale	CPU	Itanium 9100 series, the sixth-generation Itanium. Dual core, 90 nm. Successor to Montecito.	Possibly Montvale, New Jersey, USA.	2005
Moorestown	Platform	Mobile Internet platform combining the Atom Z600 series (Lincroft) CPU with the MP20 (Langwell) chipset. Successor to Menlow.	Reference unknown; see Moorestown (disambiguation) for possibilities.	2009
Morgan Hill	Chipset	Intel i865GV chipset.	Morgan Hill is a city located in the southern part of Santa Clara County, California, USA.	2006
Morrison	Motherboard	Intel Advanced/MN motherboard. LPX form factor, Socket 5, 430FX chipset (Triton).	Jim Morrison, lead singer of The Doors.	1995
Mount Prospect	Motherboard	Intel MP440BX motherboard. Uses the 440BX chipset.	Mount Prospect is a village in Cook County, Illinois	1999
Mount Union DVI	Motherboard	Intel D2700MUD desktop motherboard. Mini-ITX form factor, Atom D2700 processor (Cedarview), NM10 chipset (Tiger Point).	Reference unknown.	2012
Mount Washington	Motherboard	Intel D525MW desktop motherboard. Mini-ITX form factor, Atom D525 processor (Pineview), NM10 chipset (Tiger Point).	Reference unknown.	2010
Mukilteo	Chipset	Intel 3000 and 3010 (Mukilteo 2) chipsets, used in single-socket servers with Conroe and Kentsfield CPUs, and the E7230 chipset, used in HPC applications with the Pentium D.	Mukilteo is a city in Snohomish County, Washington, USA, located north of Seattle.	2005
Napa	Platform	Third-generation Centrino, a mobile platform combining the Core Solo and Duo (Yonah) and Core 2 Solo and Duo (Merom) CPUs with the 945 (Calistoga) chipset. Successor to Sonoma.	Napa is the county seat of Napa County, California, home to the famous Napa Valley wine region.	2005
Natoma	Chipset	Intel 440FX chipset, intended for use with the Pentium Pro and Pentium II (Klamath) CPUs.	Probably Lake Natoma, Sacramento County, California.	1996
Navy Pier	Platform	Embedded platform combining the Atom N270 (Diamondville) CPU with the 945GSE (Calistoga) chipset.	Reference unknown.	2008
Nehalem	CPU architecture	Successor to the Conroe (Core) microarchitecture. Abbreviated NHM.	The Nehalem River in Oregon, or possibly the town of Nehalem in Tillamook County, Oregon.	2004
Neptune	Chipset	Intel 430NX chipset, intended for use with Pentium CPUs.	The planet Neptune (or the Roman god Neptune).	1993
Newberry Lake	Motherboard	Intel D945GCNL motherboard. Micro-ATX form factor, Socket T (LGA775), 945GC chipset (Lakeport-GC).	Reference unknown.	2007
Niantic	LAN controller	Intel 82599 series Ethernet controllers. Dual-port, 10 Gbit/s, PCIe 2.0, 65 nm.	Niantic, A goldrush-era ship shipwrecked under the city of San Francisco.	2009
Nine Mile	Motherboard	Intel D945PLNM motherboard. Micro-ATX form factor, Socket T (LGA775), 945PL chipset (Lakeport-PL).	Reference unknown.	2006
Ninja	Motherboard	Intel Classic/PCI Expandable Desktop, Socket 3, 420EX (Aries), Baby AT, for the i486 SX/SX2, DX/DX2, DX4 Overdrive, 5x86	Reference unknown.	1994?
Nineveh	LAN controller	Intel 82566 series Ethernet PHY. Single-port, 1 Gbit/s, 90 nm.	Nineveh was an important city in ancient Assyria, referred to in the Book of Jonah.	2006
Nocona	CPU	The first 64-bit Xeon processor. Based on the 90 nm Prescott. Successor to Gallatin.	Nocona, a city in Montague County, Texas.	2001
Northwood	CPU	Second-generation Pentium 4 processor, 130 nm. Successor to Willamette.	Reference unknown; see Northwood (disambiguation) for possibilities.	1999
Novarupta	Board	Demonstration board for the experimental Rosepoint processor.	Novarupta, a volcano in Katmai National Park and Preserve, Alaska, USA, whose 1912 eruption was the largest of the 20th century.	2012
Oak Trail	Platform	Tablet platform combining the Atom Z600 series (Lincroft) CPUs with the SM35 (Whitney Point) chipset.	Reference unknown.	2010
Odem	Chipset	Intel 855PM chipset, mobile MCH used with Pentium M and Celeron M CPUs.	Mount Odem in the Golan Heights.	2002
Ophir	LAN controller	Intel 82571EB Ethernet controller. Dual-port, 1 Gbit/s, PCIe 1.0a, 90 nm.	Ophir, an ancient mysterious land.	2005
Oplin	LAN controller	Intel 82598EB Ethernet controller. Dual-port, 10 Gbit/s, PCIe 2.0, 90 nm.	Reference unknown.	2007
Orchid Island	Reference Platform	2 in 1 Detachable Reference Design with Celeron N3000	Reference unknown.	2015
Orion	Chipset	Intel 450GX chipset, intended for four-socket Pentium Pro systems.	Probably Orion (constellation) or Orion Nebula.	1995
Paint Creek	SSD	Intel 3xx series solid-state drives, 25 nm MLC, SATA 3 Gbit/s.	Reference unknown.	2011
Palm Canyon	Motherboard	Intel D945GPM motherboard. Micro-ATX form factor, Socket T (LGA775), 945G chipset (Lakeport-G).	Reference unknown.	2006
Panther Point	Chipset	Intel B75, H77, Q75, Q77, Z75, and Z77 desktop chipsets, and the HM70, HM75, HM76, HM77, QM77, QS77, and UM77 mobile chipsets, and the C216 workstation chipset, used with the Ivy Bridge CPU. Successor to Cougar Point.	Reference unknown.	2010
Patsburg	Chipset	Intel X79 chipset, and the C600 series of chipsets for two-socket servers.	Patsburg, a tiny settlement in Crenshaw County, Alabama.	2010
Paxville	CPU	The first dual-core Xeon, essentially a dual-core Irwindale, and similar to the desktop Smithfield. Paxville for MP systems was branded the Xeon 7000 series.	Paxville, a town in Clarendon County, South Carolina.	2005
Pellston	Technology	Memory error correction technology that first appeared in the Itanium 2 9000 CPU (Montecito).	Reference unknown.	2004
Pendleton	Motherboard	Intel D845PT motherboard. Micro-ATX form factor, Socket 478, 845 chipset (Brookdale).	Pendleton, Oregon.	2001
Penryn	CPU	Second-generation mobile Core 2 Duo processor, successor to Merom, and namesake of its generation, the 45 nm successor to the 65 nm Conroe.	Penryn, California, a town of about 2,000 and home to a granite quarry.	2005
Penwell	CPU	Atom CPU integrating technology licensed from Nokia and aimed at smartphones. Part of the 32 nm Saltwell family.	Reference unknown.	2010
Petrof Bay-T	Chassis	Intel SR1550 1U rackmount server chassis.	Petrof Bay in the Tongass National Forest, Alaska, USA.	2006
Picket Post	Platform	Embedded platform combining the Xeon C3500 and C5500 series CPUs (Jasper Forest) with the 3420 chipset (Ibex Peak).	Reference unknown.	2010
Piketon	Platform	Business desktop platform combining the Xeon 3400 series (Lynnfield and Clarkdale) CPUs with the Q55 (Ibex Peak) chipset.	Piketon, a village in Pike County, Ohio, USA.	2008
Pilot Point	Chassis	Intel SC5299 series of 6U pedestal or rackmount server chassis.	Reference unknown.	2006
Pilot Point-T	Chassis	Intel SC5650 series of 6U pedestal or rackmount server chassis. Supports redundant power supplies.	Reference unknown.	2009
Pine Trail	Platform	Mobile platform combining the second-generation Atom CPU (Pineview) with the NM10 (Tiger Point) chipset.	Possibly a reference to Pineview, an earlier mobile processor.	2009
Pineview	CPU	Atom D400 and N400 series (single-core) and D500 and N500 series (dual-core). All models but the N570 have GMA 3150 graphics integrated on-die. Part of the 45 nm Bonnell family.	Reference unknown. There is a town in the US state of Georgia called Pineview.	2009
Placer	Chipset	Intel E7505 chipset, used in two-socket servers and workstations with Xeon CPUs in the Foster, Gallatin, Prestonia families.	Placer County, California, USA.	2000
Plato	Motherboard	Intel Premiere/PCI II, Socket 5, 430NX (Neptune), Baby AT, Very similar to "Batman" mobo but with the slightly different chipset and socket	Greek Philosopher	1994?
Pleiades	Motherboard	Intel D915GPD motherboard. Micro-BTX form factor, Socket T (LGA775), 915G chipset (Grantsdale-G).	Pleiades star cluster.	2004
Plumas	Chipset	Intel E7500 and E7501 chipsets, used in two-socket servers with Xeon CPUs in the Foster, Gallatin, Prestonia families.	Plumas County, California, USA.	2000
Plum Creek	Motherboard	Intel D945GCPE motherboard. Micro-ATX form factor, Socket T (LGA775), 945GC chipset (Lakeport-GC).	Reference unknown.	2007
Plum Island	Motherboard	Intel D845EPI motherboard. Micro-ATX form factor, Socket 478, 845E chipset (Brookdale-E).	Reference unknown.	2003
Polar	Motherboard	Intel AC440NX four-socket server motherboard. Slot 2, 440NX chipset. Supports the Pentium II Xeon processor (Drake).	Reference unknown.	1998
Polaris	CPU	The Teraflops Research Chip, an experimental 80-core processor.	Polaris, also known as the North star.	2007
Pondicherry	Memory arbiter	Memory arbiter in the Valleyview Atom SoC.	Puducherry, India, formerly known as Pondicherry.	2012
Portland	Motherboard	Intel PD440FX motherboard. ATX form factor, Slot 1, 440FX chipset (Natoma).	Most likely: Portland, Oregon, the largest city in the state of Oregon, alternatively one of these other Portlands	1997
Portville	LAN adapter	Intel ET and ET2 server Ethernet adapters. Dual/quad-port, copper, 1 Gbit/s, PCIe 2.0. Based on the 82576EB (Kawela) controller chip.	Reference unknown.	2008
Postville	SSD	Intel X18-M and X25-M series solid state drives, 34 nm MLC, SATA 3 Gbit/s	Reference unknown.	2009
Postville Refresh	SSD	Intel 320 series solid-state drives, 25 nm MLC, SATA 3 Gbit/s	Reference unknown.	2010
Potomac	CPU	An MP version of Nocona, essentially Cranford with 4MB cache instead of 2 MB. Part of the 90 nm Prescott family.	the Potomac River, which flows through West Virginia, Maryland, Virginia, and Washington, DC, USA.	2004
Poulsbo	Chipset	Intel UL11L, US15L, US15W, US15WP, US15WPT, and US15X chipsets, used in ultra-mobile applications with Atom processors in the Silverthorne family. All models have GMA 500 integrated graphics.	Poulsbo, a waterfront city in Kitsap County, Washington, USA.	2007
Poulson	CPU	Itanium 9500 series, the eighth-generation Itanium. Up to eight cores, 32 nm. Successor to Tukwila.	Reference unknown.	2007
Powerville	LAN controller	Intel I350 series of server Ethernet controller chips. Dual-port or quad-port, 1 Gbit/s, PCIe 2.1.	Reference unknown.	2010
Prague	Motherboard	Intel D945PPR motherboard. ATX form factor, Socket T (LGA775), 945P chipset (Lakeport). OEM board for Sony.	Prague, capital of the Czech Republic.	2006
Prescott	CPU	Third-generation Pentium 4, 90 nm. Successor to Northwood.	Reference unknown; see Prescott (disambiguation) for possibilities.	2000
Presler	CPU	Pentium D 900 series and Pentium Extreme Edition 900 series processors. Part of the 65 nm Cedar Mill family. Successor to Smithfield.	Reference unknown.	2005
Prestonia	CPU	Xeon processor based on the 130 nm Northwood. Successor to Foster.	Reference unknown. Possibly Prestonia, a neighborhood southeast of Louisville, Kentucky.	2000
Providence	Motherboard	PR440FX ATX Dual Socket 8 motherboard	City in Rhode Island (?).	199x
Puget Island	RAID controller	Intel RS2PI008 and RS2PI008DE RAID controllers. SAS/SATA, 6 Gbit/s, 8 external ports, PCIe 2.0.	Puget Island, Washington, USA.	2010
Purley	Platform	1/2/4/8-socket server platform combining Skylake/Ice Lake server/workstation processor(s) with Lewisburg chipset(s).	Reference unknown.	2016
Queens Bay	Platform	Embedded platform combining the Atom E600 series processors (Tunnel Creek) with the EG20T PCH (Topcliff).	Reference unknown.	2009
Radio Springs	Motherboard	Intel D945PLRN motherboard. ATX form factor, Socket T (LGA775), 945PL chipset (Lakeport-PL).	Reference unknown.	2005
Ralston Peak	SSD	SAS family of SSDs using 34 nm-SLC, 25-nm High Endurance Technology MLC and 25-nm SLC Nand, marketed by Hitachi	Mount Ralston, located in eastern El Dorado county, California near Lake Tahoe	2011
Ramsdale	SSD	Intel 720 series solid-state drives, 34 nm SLC, PCIe.	Reference unknown.	2011
Rapid City	Motherboard	Intel D865PERC motherboard. Micro-ATX form factor, Socket 478, 865PE chipset (Springdale-PE).	Probably Rapid City, South Dakota.	2003
Raptor Lake	Microprocessor	Intel Core 13th generation CPUs, 14th Generation CPUs	Raptor Lake, NM	2022
Red Ridge	Tablet	Reference design for a tablet computer based on the Medfield processor.	Reference unknown.	2011
Redwater	LAN adapter	Intel PRO/1000 PT server Ethernet adapter. Dual-port, copper, 1 Gbit/s, PCIe. Based on the 82571 (Ophir) controller chip.	Reference unknown.	2006
Red Rock Canyon	Network switch chip	A family of Fulcrum Microsystems descending Ethernet FM10000 switching chips for the Intel Rack Scale Architecture supporting 10 Gbit/s, 25 Gbit/s, 100 Gbit/s.	Possibly named after Red Rock Canyon.	2013
Reidland	Platform	Server platform combining the Whitefield CPU with the Rose Hill chipset. Cancelled and replaced by Caneland.	Possibly named after Reidland, a census-designated place in McCracken County, Kentucky.	2005
Rexburg	Motherboard	Intel D845GRG motherboard. Micro-ATX form factor, Socket 478, 845G chipset (Brookdale-G).	Reference unknown.	2002
Richford	Platform	Server platform combining the Itanium 9300 series (Tukwila) CPUs and the Rose Hill chipset. Cancelled.	Reference unknown; see Richford (disambiguation) for possibilities.	2005
Riggins-T	Chassis	Intel SC5600 series of 5U pedestal or rackmount server chassis.	Reference unknown.	2009
Rimon	LAN controller	Intel 82572EI Ethernet controller. Single-port, 1 Gbit/s, PCIe 1.0a, 90 nm.	Rimon is the Hebrew word for pomegranate.	2005
Rio Vista	Motherboard	Intel D945PVS motherboard. ATX form factor, Socket T (LGA775), 945P chipset (Lakeport).	Reference unknown.	2006
River Trail	Software	Parallel Extensions for JavaScript, which accelerates JavaScript execution by taking advantage of multiple cores and vector instructions.	Reference unknown.	2011
Robson	Flash cache	Intel Turbo Memory, a NAND flash-memory caching technology.	Mount Robson, the highest point in the Canadian Rockies.	2006
Rochester	Motherboard	Intel RC440BX motherboard. Based on the 440BX chipset. ATX or microATX form factors, Slot 1.	Reference unknown; see Rochester (disambiguation) for possibilities.	1998
Rock Creek	CPU	Single-chip cloud computer (SCC), an experimental 48-core processor.	Reference unknown; see Rock Creek (disambiguation) for possibilities.	2009
Rock Harbor	Motherboard	Intel D865GRH motherboard. Micro-ATX form factor, Socket 478, 865G chipset (Springdale).	Reference unknown.	2003
Rock Lake	Motherboard	Intel D865PERL motherboard. ATX form factor, Socket 478, 865PE chipset (Springdale-PE).	Reference unknown.	2003
Rocket Lake	Microprocessor	Intel's 11th generation CPU family.	Reference unknown.	2021
Rockwell	CPU architecture	Die shrink of Haswell. Renamed to Broadwell.	Reference unknown.	2010
Romley	Platform	Two-socket server platform combining the Xeon E5-2600 processor (Jaketown) with the C600 series chipsets (Patsburg).	Reference unknown.	2011
Rosepoint	SoC	Experimental SoC with a digital WiFi transceiver and dual-core Atom processor. 32 nm.	Reference unknown.	2012
Rose Hill	Chipset	Chipset for the cancelled Reidland and Richford server platforms, also cancelled.	Reference unknown.	2005
Salt Creek	Platform	Business desktop platform combining various Core 2 (Conroe, Wolfdale, Yorkfield, and Kentsfield) CPUs with the Bearlake chipset.	Salt Creek is the name of various places in the US. Reference unknown	2005
Saltwell	CPU architecture	Second-generation Atom processor, 32 nm. Successor to Bonnell.	Reference unknown.	2009
San Clemente	Chipset	Intel 5100 chipset, used in two-socket servers with Xeon processors in the 65 nm Conroe and 45 nm Penryn families.	San Clemente is a city in Orange County, California, USA.	2007
Sandusky	Motherboard	Intel D945PSN motherboard. ATX form factor, Socket T (LGA775), 945P chipset (Lakeport).	Probably Sandusky, Ohio.	2005
Sandy Bridge	CPU architecture	Successor to the Nehalem microarchitecture. Manufactured on the same 32 nm process as Westmere. Renamed from Gesher. Abbreviated SNB.	Gesher in Hebrew means bridge and there is a lot of sand in Israel. Thus "Sandy Bridge" is born.	2007
Sandy Canal	Motherboard	Intel D865GSA motherboard. Micro-ATX form factor, Socket T (LGA775), 865G chipset (Springdale).	Reference unknown.	2006
Santa Rosa	Platform	Fourth-generation Centrino, a mobile platform that combines the Core 2 Duo (Merom and Penryn) CPUs with the 965 series (Crestline) chipsets. Successor to Napa.	Santa Rosa, California	2006
Saturn	Chipset	Intel 420TX chipset, intended for use with the i486 CPU.	The planet Saturn (or the Roman god Saturn (mythology)).	1992
Saturn II	Chipset	Intel 420ZX chipset, intended for use with the i486 CPU.	The planet Saturn (or the Roman god Saturn (mythology)).	1994
Scanlon Bay	Motherboard	Intel DH61SA desktop motherboard. Micro-ATX form factor, LGA 1155, H61 chipset (Cougar Point).	Scanlon Bay in the Lake Mead National Recreation Area, Nevada, USA.	2011
Sea Breeze	Motherboard	Intel D845GVSR motherboard. Micro-ATX form factor, Socket 478, 845GV chipset (Brookdale-GV).	Reference unknown.	2003
Seaburg	Chipset	Intel 5400 chipset, used in two-socket servers with Xeon processors in the 65 nm Conroe and 45 nm Penryn families. Successor to Greencreek.	Seaburg is the name of a town in Idaho County, Idaho, USA. See List of places in Idaho/S.	2006
Seacliff Trail	LAN	A reference Ethernet switch based on the FM6000 chip (Alta) and supporting software-defined networking.	Reference unknown.	2012
Seattle	Motherboard	Intel SE440BX motherboard. Based on the Intel 440BX chipset. ATX form factor, Slot 1. This codename is sometimes applied to the 440BX chipset as well.	Seattle, the largest city in the Pacific Northwest region of the United States.	1998
Shady Cove	Motherboard	Intel S5520SC workstation motherboard. SSI EEB form factor, Socket B (LGA1366), 5520 chipset (Tylersburg). This codename also applies to the S5520SCWS workstation system.	Reference unknown.	2010
Sharkey	Motherboard	Intel D915PSY motherboard. Micro-ATX form factor, Socket T (LGA775), 915P chipset (Grantsdale).	Reference unknown.	2004
Shark Bay	Platform	Ninth generation Centrino, a mobile platform combining the Haswell processor with the Lynx Point chipset. Successor to Chief River.	Shark Bay is a World Heritage Site in the Gascoyne region of Western Australia.	2012
Sheepshead Bay	LAN adapter	Intel PRO/1000 PF server Ethernet adapter. Single-port, fiber, 1 Gbit/s, PCIe. Based on the 82572 controller chip (Rimon).	Sheepshead Bay in Brooklyn, New York, USA.	2005
Shell Bay	Board	Customer reference board for the EG20T chipset (Topcliff).	Reference unknown.	2012
Shelter Island	LAN adapter	Intel CT desktop Ethernet adapter. Single-port, copper, 1 Gbit/s, PCIe 2.0. Based on the 82574L (Hartwell) controller chip.	May be a reference to Shelter Island in New York.	2008
Shelton	CPU	Celeron M aimed at low-cost and embedded applications. Essentially a Banias-based Celeron M with the L2 cache removed.	Shelton, a city in Mason County, Washington, USA.	2004
Shiloh	WLAN controller	Intel WiFi Link 5100 mini-PCIe adapter, also called Shirley Peak 1x2. Part of the Montevina platform.	Reference unknown; see Shiloh (disambiguation) for possibilities.	2006
Shirley Peak	WLAN controller	Intel Ultimate N WiFi Link 5300 mini-PCIe adapter. Part of the Montevina platform. Formerly called Dana Point.	Shirley Peak is a mountain in the Greenhorn Mountains of the Sierra Nevada, just northwest of Lake Isabella.	2007
Shoal Creek	Motherboard	Intel D865VSC motherboard. Uses the 865V chipset (Springdale-GV).	Reference unknown.	2005
Sibley	Flash memory	Intel M18 StrataFlash memory, a 90 nm MLC NOR flash memory chip.	Possibly Sibley mountain in Sierra County, New Mexico, USA.	2005
Sierra Grande	RAID controller	Intel RS2SG244 RAID controller. SAS/SATA, 6 Gbit/s, 24 internal ports and 4 external ports, PCIe 2.0.	Sierra Grande, an extinct shield volcano in northeastern New Mexico, USA.	2010
Siler	Motherboard	Intel DX79SI desktop motherboard. ATX form factor, Socket R (LGA 2011), X79 chipset (Patsburg). Supports the Sandy Bridge-E processor.	Reference unknown.	2011
Silvermont	CPU architecture	Third-generation Atom processor, 22 nm. Successor to Saltwell. Expected in 2013.	Reference unknown.	2011
Silver Reef	Motherboard	Intel D845PESV motherboard. ATX form factor, Socket 478, 845PE chipset (Brookdale-PE).	Reference unknown.	2002
Silverthorne	CPU	Atom Z500 series processors, aimed at low-power applications. Part of the 45 nm Bonnell family.	Possibly named after Silverthorne, Colorado.	2007
Silvervale	Technology	Processor virtualization technology that first appeared in the Itanium 2 9000 CPU (Montecito).	Reference unknown.	2004
Skulltrail	Platform	Enthusiast gaming platform combining the Core 2 Extreme QX9775 (Yorkfield) CPU with the 5400 (Seaburg) chipset.	The name is most likely related to Bonetrail, an associated Intel motherboard.	2007
Skylake	CPU architecture	Successor to the Haswell microarchitecture. Manufactured on the same 14 nm process as Broadwell. Abbreviated SKL.	Reference unknown.	2015
Smackover 2	Motherboard	Intel DX58SO2 desktop motherboard. ATX form factor, LGA 1366, X58 chipset (Tylersburg).	Smackover, Arkansas, USA.	2010
Smithfield	CPU	Pentium D 800 series and the Pentium Extreme Edition 840. Dual-core. Part of the 90 nm Prescott family. Successor to Prescott.	Reference unknown; see Smithfield (disambiguation) for possibilities.	2004
Snow Hill	Motherboard	Intel S3210SHLX, S3210SHLC, and BSHBBL server motherboards. ATX form factor, Socket T (LGA775), 3210 chipset (Bigby). Also applies to server systems containing these motherboards.	Reference unknown.	2007
Soda Creek	SSD	Intel 310 series solid-state drives, mSATA form factor, 34 nm MLC, SATA 3 Gbit/s.	Reference unknown.	2010
Sodaville	SoC	Atom CE4100 processor, intended for consumer electronics devices.	Sodaville, a city in Linn County, Oregon, USA.	2008
SoFIA	SoC	Atom processor with 3G modem.	Unknown	2008
Solano	Chipset	Intel 815, 815E, 815EG, 815EP, 815G, and 815P chipsets, used with Pentium II and Pentium III processors.	Solano County, California, USA.	2000
Sonoma	Platform	Second-generation Centrino, a mobile platform that combines the Pentium M (Dothan) CPU with the 915 (Alviso) chipset. Successor to Carmel.	Reference unknown; see Sonoma (disambiguation) for possibilities.	2004
Sorrento	Motherboard	Intel D945GNT motherboard. ATX form factor, Socket T (LGA775), 945G chipset (Lakeport-G).	Reference unknown.	2005
Sossaman	CPU	Xeon LV and ULV, aimed at low-power applications. Based on the 65 nm Yonah, a mobile processor.	Reference unknown.	2005
South Bend	LAN adapter	Intel PRO/1000 S server Ethernet adapter. Single-port, copper, 1 Gbit/s, PCI. Based on the 82550B (Gamla) controller chip.	Reference South Bend, Indiana, location of the University of Notre Dame.	2002
South Lake	Motherboard	Intel D915GSN motherboard. BTX form factor, Socket T (LGA775), 915G chipset (Grantsdale-G). OEM board for Gateway.	Reference unknown.	2004
Spring Fountain	LAN adapter	Intel X520 series server Ethernet adapters. Single/dual-port, copper/fiber, 10 Gbit/s, PCIe 2.0. Based on the 82599 (Niantic) controller chip.	Reference unknown.	2009
Spring Meadow	Technology	Power-saving measure that allows the NIC to filter packets and defer work without waking the CPU.	Reference unknown.	2012
Springdale	Chipset	Intel 865G, 865GV, 865P, and 865PE chipsets. Used with Pentium 4 processors.	Reference unknown; see Springdale (disambiguation) for possibilities.	2001
Stealey	CPU	A100 and A110 mobile processors, based on Dothan.	Possibly Stealey, West Virginia, USA.	2005
Stebbins 2	LAN adapter	Intel PRO/1000 GT desktop Ethernet adapter. Single-port, copper, 1 Gbit/s, PCI. Based on the 82541PI controller chip (Tabor 3).	Reference unknown.	2004
Stellarton	SoC	Atom E600 (Tunnel Creek) processor with on-chip FPGA. Part of the 45 nm Bonnell family.	Stellarton, Nova Scotia.	2010
Stoakley	Platform	Two-way server platform combining the Xeon 5400 series (Harpertown) CPUs with the 5400 (Seaburg) chipset.	Reference unknown. Stoakley is the name of a town in Ireland and in Maryland, USA.	2007
Stoneville	Motherboard	Intel D865PESO motherboard. ATX form factor, Socket 478, 865PE chipset (Springdale-PE).	Reference unknown.	2003
Stonylake	LAN adapter	Intel I350-T2 and I350-T4 server Ethernet adapters. Dual-port (T2) or quad-port (T4), copper, 10 Gbit/s, PCIe 2.0. Based on the I350 controller chip (Powerville).	Reference unknown.	2011
Stormville	Motherboard	Intel DX79SR motherboard. ATX form factor, LGA2011 socket, Intel X79 chipset	Stormville, NY.	2012
Stoutland	Technology	Processor with integrated memory controller.	May be named after Stoutland, a village in Camden and Laclede County, Missouri.	2007
Strawberry Mountain	Motherboard	Intel DQ67SW desktop motherboard. Micro-ATX form factor, LGA 1155, Q67 chipset (Cougar Point).	Reference unknown.	2011
Sugar Bay	Platform	Desktop platform combining the Sandy Bridge CPU with the P67 (Cougar Point) chipset.	Reference unknown.	2010
Sunnymead	Motherboard	Intel D945GSU motherboard. MicroBTX form factor, 945G chipset (Lakeport-G). OEM board for Dell.	Reference unknown.	2005
Sunrise Lake	I/O processor	Intel IOP348 I/O processor.	Reference uncertain.	2007
Sunset Highway	VRM	VRM featured on the Crystal Cove PMIC for Bay Lake CRB.	Sunset Highway (Oregon), USA.	2012
Tabor	LAN controller	Intel 82541ER Ethernet controller. Single-port, 1 Gbit/s, PCI, 130 nm.	Presumably a reference to Mount Tabor in Israel.	2004
Tabor II	LAN controller	Intel 82541GI Ethernet controller. Single-port, 1 Gbit/s, PCI, 130 nm.	Presumably a reference to Mount Tabor in Israel.	2003
Tabor 3	LAN controller	Intel 82541PI Ethernet controller. Single-port, 1 Gbit/s, PCI, 130 nm.	Presumably a reference to Mount Tabor in Israel.	2004
Tahiti	Motherboard	Intel Advanced/ZE motherboard, renamed from Zappa-E after a complaint from Frank Zappa's estate.	Tahiti, the largest island in the Windward group of French Polynesia.	1995
Tanacross	LAN controller	Intel 82547GI Ethernet controller. Single-port, 1 Gbit/s, PCI-X, 130 nm.	Tanacross, Alaska, USA.	2003
Tanglewood	CPU	Seventh-generation Itanium processor. Renamed to Tukwila after the Tanglewood Music Center in Massachusetts demanded a switch.	Reference unknown; see Tanglewood (disambiguation) for possibilities.	2003
Tanner	CPU	The first version of the Pentium III Xeon processor, based on the 250 nm Katmai. Successor to Drake.	Possibly Tanner Creek, a creek in Portland, Oregon.	1998
Tappen	Motherboard	Intel D945GTP motherboard. Micro-ATX form factor, Socket T (LGA775), 945G chipset (Lakeport-G).	Reference unknown.	2005
Taylorsville	SSD	Intel S3700 enterprise-class SSD. 2.5-inch and 1.8-inch form factors, MLC-HET, SATA, 6 Gbit/s. Successor to Lyndonville.	Reference unknown.	2011
Tehama	Chipset	Intel 850 and 850E chipsets, used with the Pentium 4 CPU.	Mount Tehama, an ancient volcano in northern California.	1999
Tejas	CPU	Planned successor to the Prescott Pentium 4. Cancelled.	Reference unknown; see Tejas (disambiguation) for possibilities.	2003
Tekoa	LAN controller	Intel 82573 series Ethernet controllers. Single-port, 1 Gbit/s, PCIe 1.0a, 130 nm.	Presumably a reference to the biblical city of Tekoa.	2005
Thete	CPU	Core 2 Extreme QX9750, based on the 45 nm Yorkfield. Rare, never released publicly by Intel.	Most likely a variant of the Greek letter Theta.	2008
Thor	Motherboard	Intel Advanced/ATX motherboard. ATX form factor, Socket 7, 430FX chipset (Triton).	Reference unknown.	1995
Thorsby	Motherboard	Intel DX79TO desktop motherboard. ATX form factor, Socket R (LGA 2011), X79 chipset (Patsburg). Supports the Sandy Bridge-E processor.	Reference unknown.	2011
Thurley	Platform	Two-way server platform combining the Xeon 5500 series (Gainestown) CPUs with the 5500 series (Tylersburg) chipsets.	Likely a member of the Thurley family.	2008
Tiger Point	Chipset	Intel NM10 Express chipset, a PCH used with the Pineview Atom CPU in the Pine Trail platform	Reference unknown.	2009
Tiger Lake	Microprocessor	11th generation Intel Core mobile processors based on the Willow Cove Core microarchitecture	Tiger Lake, WA	2020
Tigerton	CPU	Xeon 7200 series (dual-core) and 7300 series (quad-core), used in four-socket servers. Replacement for the cancelled Whitefield.	Possibly Tigerton, a village in Shawano County, Wisconsin, USA.	2005
Tillamook	CPU	Pentium MMX P55C for notebooks.	Probably named after Tillamook, Oregon, the county seat of Tillamook County, Oregon, and situated on the Tillamook River which empties into Tillamook Bay.	1997
Timber Creek	Server	Intel SR2612URR 2U rackmount server.	Reference unknown.	2009
Timna	SoC	System-on-a-chip based on the Pentium II. Cancelled.	Reference unknown; see Timna for possibilities.	1999
Tolapai	SoC	Intel EP80579, a system-on-a-chip based on the 90 nm Dothan Pentium M, aimed at embedded applications.	Possibly Tolapai Spring, Arizona, USA.	2007
Tonga	CPU	Pentium II Mobile processor, 250 nm.	Probably the island nation of Tonga.	1998
Topcliff	Chipset	Intel EG20T PCH, for use with Atom E600 series (Tunnel Creek) processors.	Reference unknown.	2009
Triton	Chipset	Intel 430FX chipset, intended for use with Pentium CPUs.	Probably the Greek god Triton.	1995
Truland	Platform	Four-way server platform combining Xeon 7000 (Paxville) and Xeon 7100 (Tulsa) CPUs with E8500 (Twin Castle) chipsets.	Reference unknown.	2005
Trumbull	Flash memory	180 nm MLC NOR flash memory.	Mount Trumbull in Mojave County, Arizona.	2001
Tualatin	CPU	Third-generation Pentium III, sold as Pentium III and Celeron in both desktop and mobile forms. 130 nm. Successor to Coppermine.	Tualatin is a town, river, and valley in Oregon; in the Portland metro area. Intel's large manufacturing and design facilities in Oregon are located in the Tualatin Valley.	2000
Tucson	Motherboard	Intel TC430HX. ATX form factor, 430HX chipset	Reference unknown, possibly Tucson, Arizona	1996
Tukwila	CPU	Itanium 9300 series, the seventh-generation Itanium. Quad-core, 65 nm. Successor to Montecito. Renamed from Tanglewood.	Tukwila, Washington.	2003
Tulloch	Chipset	Intel i855 chipset. Cancelled in favor of the Tehama chipset.	Tulloch is the name of a reservoir in Tuolumne County, California.	2000
Tulsa	CPU	Xeon 7100 series, for use in MP servers. Based on the 65 nm Cedar Mill. Successor to Paxville.	Tulsa, the second-largest city in the U.S. state of Oklahoma and the county seat of Tulsa County.	2003
Tunnel Creek	SoC	Atom E600 series processors, aimed at embedded applications. Part of the 45 nm Bonnell family.	Reference unknown.	2009
Tunnel Mountain	Motherboard	Intel DQ57TML desktop motherboard. Micro-ATX form factor, LGA 1156, Q57 chipset (Ibex Peak).	Reference unknown.	2010
Tumwater	Chipset	Intel E7525 chipset, used in two-socket workstations with the Nocona and Irwindale Xeon CPUs.	Tumwater is a city in Thurston County, Washington next to the Deschutes River.	2003
Tupelo	Motherboard	Intel STL2 two-socket server motherboard. EATX form factor, Socket 370, ServerWorks ServerSet III LE chipset.	Reference unknown.	2000
Twin Castle	Chipset	Intel E8500 and E8501 chipsets, used in four-socket servers with the Xeon 7000 and 7100 series CPUs (Paxville and Tulsa).	Reference unknown.	2003
Twinville	LAN controller	Intel X540-AT2 Ethernet controller. Dual-port, 10 Gbit/s, PCIe 2.1, 40 nm.	Reference unknown.	2010
Tylersburg	Chipset	Intel X58 Express desktop chipset, and also the name of a gaming platform combining this chipset with Core i7 and Core i7 Extreme Edition (Nehalem and Westmere) CPUs. Also the 5500 and 5520 chipsets, used in two-socket servers with the Xeon 5500 and 5600 (Gainestown and Westmere-EP) CPUs. Successor to Bearlake on the desktop and Seaburg on the server.	May be named after a place in Pennsylvania.	2007
Tyax	Flash memory	Intel L18 StrataFlash Wireless memory, a 130 nm MLC NOR flash memory chip.	Probably Tyax Mountain in the Chilocotin Mountains of British Columbia, Canada.	2003
Union Peak	Chassis	Intel P4308XX series 4U rackmount or pedestal server chassis. Supports the S2600CP (Canoe Pass) and S2600CO (Copper Pass) motherboards.	Reference unknown.	2011
Urbanna	Motherboard	Intel S5520UR two-socket server motherboard. Based on the 5520 (Tylersburg) chipset and supporting the Xeon 5500 and 5600 series processors (Gainestown and Gulftown).	Reference unknown.	2010
Val Vista	I/O controller	Intel IOC340, an XScale-based 8-port RAID controller chip supporting both SAS and SATA drives.	Reference unknown.	2006
Valley Island	Motherboard	Intel Atom Processor E3800 Processor Development Kit	Reference unknown.	2014
Valleyview	SoC	Dual-core and quad-core Atom processors aimed at a wide range of applications. Has Ivy Bridge graphics in place of PowerVR. Part of the 22 nm Silvermont family. Abbreviated VLV.	Valley View, Texas, USA.	2010
Vancouver	Motherboard	Intel VC820 motherboard. ATX form factor, Slot 1, 820 chipset (Camino).	Probably Vancouver, British Columbia, or Vancouver, Washington which lies immediately north of Portland, Oregon.	1999
Vanderpool	Technology	Intel VT-x, a virtualization technology for x86 processors.	Vanderpool, a small settlement in Bandera County, Texas.	2003
Vanguard	Motherboard	Intel D915GLVG motherboard. Micro-ATX form factor, Socket T (LGA775), 915GL chipset (Grantsdale-GL).	Reference unknown.	2005
Venus	Motherboard	VS440FX ATX Socket 8 motherboard	Roman goddess (?).	199x
Victor Island	Blade	Intel MFS5520VIR two-socket blade server. 2 × LGA 1366, 5520 chipset (Tylersburg).	Reference unknown.	2009
Vidalia	LAN controller	Intel 82573L Ethernet controller. Single-port, 1 Gbit/s, PCIe 1.0a, 130 nm.	Vidalia is a variety of onions named after Vidalia, Georgia.	2005
Villanova	Motherboard	Intel D845GLVA motherboard. Micro-ATX form factor, Socket 478, 845GL chipset (Brookdale-GL).	Probably Villanova University.	2003
Waimea Bay	Platform	Enthusiast desktop platform combining the Sandy Bridge-E CPU with the X79 (Patsburg) chipset.	Waimea Bay, near Pupukea on the Hawaiian island of Oahu.	2010
Walnut Grove	RAID controller	Intel RS2WG160 RAID controller. SAS/SATA, 6 Gbit/s, 16 ports, PCIe 2.0.	Reference unknown.	2010
Warm River	Motherboard	Intel DG41WV desktop motherboard. Micro-ATX form factor, LGA 775, G41 chipset (Eaglelake).	Warm River, Idaho, USA.	2010
Warm Springs	Motherboard	Intel WS440BX motherboard. Based on the 440BX chipset. ATX form factor, Slot 1 socket.	Possibly Warm Springs, an unincorporated community in the Warm Springs Indian Reservation, in Oregon, USA.	1998
Washington Pass	Motherboard	Intel S2600WP and S2600WPQ two-socket half-width rackmount server motherboards. Custom form factor, Socket R (LGA 2011), C600 chipset (Patsburg). Supports the Xeon E5-2600 processor (Jaketown).	Reference unknown.	2011
Wellsburg	Chipset	PCH for two- and four-socket servers based on the Grantley-EP platform. Successor to Patsburg.	Possibly Wellsburg, WV.	2012
West Branch	Motherboard	Intel D915GVWB motherboard. Micro-ATX form factor, Socket T (LGA775), 915GV chipset (Grantsdale-GV).	Reference unknown.	2004
Westmere	CPU architecture	Die shrink of Nehalem from 45 nm to 32 nm. Originally code-named Nehalem-C. Abbreviated WSM.	Named after a suburb of Auckland, New Zealand.	2006
Weybridge	Platform	Business desktop platform combining various Core 2 (Conroe, Kentsfield, Wolfdale, Yorkfield) CPUs with the Bearlake chipset.	Named after the town of Weybridge in the Elmbridge district of Surrey in South East England.	2007
Whale Cove	RAID controller	Intel RS2WC040 and RS2WC080 RAID controllers. SAS/SATA, 6 Gbit/s, 4 ports (RS2WC040) or 8 ports (RS2WC080), PCIe 2.0.	Reference unknown.	2010
Whitefield	CPU	Quad-core Xeon processor, the intended successor to Tulsa. Cancelled and replaced by Tigerton.	Whitefield, a suburb of Bangalore, India.	2004
Whitesburg	Motherboard	Intel DP55WB desktop motherboard. MicroATX form factor, LGA 1156, P55 chipset (Ibex Peak).	Reference unknown.	2009
White Salmon	Motherboard	Intel D945PWM motherboard. ATX form factor, Socket T (LGA775), 945P chipset (Lakeport). Also called White Swan.	Reference unknown.	2008
Whitmore Lake	Chipset	Intel 3100 embedded chipset.	Reference unknown.	2008
Whitney	Chipset	Intel 810 series chipsets, used with Celeron, Pentium II, and Pentium III CPUs. Includes integrated graphics.	Reference unknown; see Whitney (disambiguation) for possibilities.	1999
Whitney Point	Chipset	Intel SM35 Express chipset, a PCH used with the Atom Z560 and Z670 (Lincroft) CPUs in the Oak Trail platform.	Reference unknown.	2010
Wichita	Motherboard	Intel D815EWT motherboard. FlexATX form factor, Socket 370, 815E chipset (Solano).	City in Kansas.	
Wildwood Trail	RAID controller	Intel SASWT4I entry-level RAID controller. SAS/SATA, 4 internal ports, 3.0 Gbit/s, PCIe x4. Based on the LSI 1068E chip.	Wildwood Trail - Forest Park - Portland, OR	2008
Wilkins Peak	WLAN	Wireless networking module in the Shark Bay Centrino platform.	Reference unknown.	2011
Willamette	CPU	First-generation Pentium 4 processor, and the first implementation of the NetBurst microarchitecture. 180 nm. Successor to Coppermine.	Willamette River or the Willamette Valley region of Oregon, where a large number of Intel manufacturing facilities are located.	1998
Willapa Bay	RAID controller	Intel SRCSATAWB RAID controller. SATA, 8 internal ports, 3.0 Gbit/s, PCIe x4. Based on the LSI 1078 chip.	Willapa Bay in Washington, USA.	2007
Willowbrook	Motherboard	Intel S5500WB and S5500WB12V server motherboards. SSI EATX form factor, Socket B (LGA1366), 5500 chipset (Tylersburg). Also the SR1690WBR server system.	Reference unknown.	2009
Willow Springs	Motherboard	Intel WL810 motherboard. MicroATX form factor, Socket 370, 810 chipset (Whitney).	Willow Springs, Illinois, USA.	1999
Willow Springs 2	Motherboard	Intel WL810E motherboard. MicroATX form factor, Socket 370, 810E chipset (Whitney).	Willow Springs, Illinois, USA.	2000
Windigo	WWAN controller	WWAN Internet access via HSDPA cellular networks. Planned as part of the Santa Rosa platform, but later dropped.	Possibly Lake Windigo, Minnesota, USA.	2006
Windmill	Motherboard	Half-width two-socket server motherboard designed in cooperation with Facebook as part of the Open Compute Project. Uses the Xeon E5-2600 (Jaketown) processor and the C602 (Patsburg) chipset.	Reference unknown.	2012
Winnipeg	Motherboard	Intel D845WN motherboard. ATX form factor, Socket 478, 845 chipset (Brookdale).	Winnipeg, Manitoba, Canada.	2001
Winterset	Motherboard	Intel D845WR motherboard. Micro-ATX form factor, Socket 478, 845 chipset (Brookdale).	Reference unknown.	
Winter Park	Motherboard	Intel S875WP1-E server motherboard. ATX form factor, Socket 478, 875P chipset (Canterwood).	Reference unknown.	2003
Wolfdale	CPU	Core 2 Duo E7000 and E8000 series, Pentium E5000 and E6000 series, Celeron E3000 series, and Xeon 3000, 3100, and 5200 series. Part of the 45 nm Penryn family.	Possibly Wolfdale, a census-designated place in Washington County, Pennsylvania, USA.	2005
Woodcrest	CPU	Xeon 5100 series, all dual-core, aimed at two-socket servers. Part of the 65 nm Conroe family. Successor to Dempsey.	Woodcrest, a census-designated place in Riverside County, California, USA.	2005
Woodinville	LAN controller	Intel 82552V Ethernet PHY. Single-port, 100 Mbit/s, 130 nm.	Woodinville is a city in King County, Washington, USA.	2009
Woodridge	Motherboard	Intel D915PLWD motherboard. ATX form factor, Socket T (LGA775), 915PL chipset (Grantsdale-PL).	Reference unknown.	2005
Woodruff	Motherboard	Intel S845WD1-E server motherboard. ATX form factor, Socket 478, 845E chipset. Also the codename of servers containing this motherboard.	Reference unknown.	2003
Woodsworth	Motherboard	Intel DH61WW desktop motherboard. Micro-ATX form factor, LGA 1155, H61 chipset (Cougar Point). Also spelled Woodworth.	Reference unknown.	2012
Wyloway	Platform	Single-socket workstation platform combining various Conroe, Presler, and Kentsfield CPUs with the 975X (Glenwood) chipset.	Possibly named after Wyloway, a settlement in the state of Georgia in United States.	2006
Yamhill	CPU architecture	The Intel 64 CPU microarchitecture, later renamed Clackamas.	Reference unknown; see Yamhill (disambiguation) for possibilities.	2002
Yampai	Motherboard	Intel YA810E desktop motherboard. FlexATX form factor, Socket 370, 810E chipset (Whitney).	Yampai is a populated place in Yavapai County Arizona	1999
Yonah	CPU	Core Solo, Core Duo, Celeron M 200 and 400 series, and the dual-core Pentium Mobile T2000 series. 65 nm. Successor to Dothan.	Reference unknown; see Yonah (disambiguation) for possibilities. Could be named after Yonah, IN	2004
Yorkfield	CPU	Core 2 Quad Q8000 and Q9000 series, Core 2 Extreme QX9000 series, and the Xeon 3300 series, all with four cores. Part of the 45 nm Penryn family. Successor to Kentsfield.	Reference unknown.	2005
Zanesville	Motherboard	Intel DZ68ZV desktop motherboard. ATX form factor, LGA 1155, Z68 chipset (Cougar Point).	Reference unknown.	2011
Zappa	Motherboard	Intel Advanced/ZP and Advanced/ZE (Zappa-E, later Tahiti) motherboards. Baby-AT form factor, Socket 5, 430FX chipset (Triton).	The musician Frank Zappa. Zappa's estate was displeased by the use of his name, prompting a change in Intel's naming policy.	1995
Zellwood	Motherboard	Intel DH61ZE desktop motherboard. Micro-ATX form factor, LGA 1155, H61 chipset (Cougar Point).	Zellwood, Florida, USA.	2012
Zion	IO processor	Intel 80303 I/O processor. Embeds an i960 core.	Reference unknown. Possibly Zion National Park in Utah.	2002
Zoar	LAN controller	Intel 82575EB Ethernet controller. Dual-port, 1 Gbit/s, PCIe 2.0, 90 nm.	Presumably a reference to the biblical city of Zoara.	2007
Codename	Category	Description	Named after	Year

== See also ==
- List of Intel microprocessors
