= Moorestown =

Moorestown may refer to:

Technology:

- Moorestown computing platform by Intel

United States geography:

- Moorestown, Michigan
- Moorestown, New Jersey
- Moorestown-Lenola, New Jersey

United States education:

- Moorestown Friends School, private Quaker school located at East Main Street and Chester Avenue in Moorestown, New Jersey
- Moorestown High School, four-year comprehensive public high school that serves students in ninth through twelfth grades
- Moorestown Township Public Schools, comprehensive community public school district

United States court cases

- Hornstine v. Moorestown, a 2003 case in U.S. Federal District Court

== See also ==
- Moorstown Castle
