= Intel X79 =

Intel chipset

- Codename: Patsburg
- CPU supported: Intel Core i7 (Sandy Bridge-E) (Ivy Bridge-E)
- Socket supported: LGA 2011 also known as socket LGA 2011-1 and Socket R
- Fabrication process: 65 nm
- TDP: 7.8 W

Miscellaneous
- Release date: November 14, 2011
- Predecessor: Intel X58 (Uses CPU Socket LGA 1366)
- Successor: Intel X99 (Uses CPU Socket LGA 2011 V3)

The Intel X79 (codenamed Patsburg) is a Platform Controller Hub (PCH) designed and manufactured by Intel for their LGA 2011 (Socket R) and LGA 2011-1 (Socket R2).

Socket and chipset support CPUs targeted at the high-end desktop (HEDT) and enthusiast segments of the Intel product lineup: Core i7-branded and Xeon-branded processors from the Sandy Bridge and Ivy Bridge CPU architectures.

The supported CPUs feature quad channel memory controllers, and a certain number of PCIe lanes, the chipset features additional PCIe lanes; it is designed to connect an Intel processor through a DMI 2.0 interface to peripheral devices.

== Features ==
The first product was announced on November 14, 2011, for "Extreme" CPUs using the LGA 2011 socket.

Features include:

- 2× Serial ATA (SATA) 3.0 (6 Gbit/s) ports & 4x SATA 2 (3 Gbit/s) ports.
- 8× PCI Express 2.0 lanes
- 14 Universal Serial Bus (USB) 2.0 ports
- Integrated Gigabit Ethernet MAC (Lewisville PHY)
- Optional Intel Rapid Storage Technology enterprise 3.0
  - SATA RAID support (0/1/10/5)
  - Write journaling
- 100 MHz BCLK
- Supports processor, memory and chipset overclocking
- Supports Intel Extreme Tuning Utility 3.0 (XTU)
- 8-layer printed circuit board (PCB), 2 oz copper recommended

The X79 chipset is made to work with the Intel LGA 2011 (Socket R) which features 2011 copper pins. The added pins allow for more PCI Express lanes and interconnects for server class processors.

Newer Core and Xeon processors address 40 PCI Express 3.0 lanes directly through Sandy Bridge-E architecture (Xeon) and Ivy Bridge architecture (Core processors).

== Partial support for Windows XP ==
The X79 chipset does not support installing Windows XP in AHCI mode for Intel's Serial ATA controllers as Intel won't release AHCI drivers for 32-bit Windows XP. Windows XP can be installed in IDE mode but without SATA features enabled. For users that dual boot Windows XP with another operating system installed in AHCI mode, this means changing to IDE mode every time to boot into Windows XP and changing back to SATA to boot the other OS, or installing the other OS which supports AHCI also in IDE mode to prevent switching the setting in the BIOS each time. This restriction applies only to 32-bit Windows XP; 64-bit Windows XP is supported by Intel drivers.

For motherboards with X79 chipset but with third party SATA disk controllers, 32-bit Windows XP AHCI drivers may still be supported by the disk controller vendor (non-Intel).

A third party, generic Intel AHCI/RAID driver for 32-bit Windows XP has been released by Fernando.

== See also ==
- List of Intel chipsets
- Platform Controller Hub (PCH)
