= Kenai (disambiguation) =

Kenai may refer to:

== Places ==
- Kenai, Alaska, a city in Kenai Peninsula Borough, Alaska
- Kenai Peninsula, a large peninsula in south-central Alaska
- Kenai River, a river on the Kenai Peninsula
- Kenai Mountains, a mountain range in Alaska
- Kenai Fjords National Park
- Kenai Municipal Airport
- Kenai National Wildlife Refuge

== Organizations ==
- Kenai Peninsula Borough, the local government of the Peninsula and some surrounding areas
- Kenai Peninsula Borough School District
- Kenai Peninsula College, a unit of the University of Alaska Anchorage
- the Kenaitze tribe, a branch of the Dena'ina people and the original inhabitants of Kenai

== Miscellaneous ==
- Kenai (Brother Bear), a Disney character
- Kenai, a song by Alaskan metalcore band 36 Crazyfists, from their album A Snow Capped Romance
- Kenai, a rugged tablet computer from Trimble Navigation
