= Millington =

Millington may refer to:

== Places ==
=== United Kingdom ===
- Millington, East Riding of Yorkshire, a village
- Millington, Cheshire, a former civil parish

=== United States ===
- Millington, Connecticut, a village
- Millington, Illinois, a village
- Millington, Maryland, a town
- Millington, Michigan, a village
- Millington Township, Michigan, a township
- Millington, New Jersey, a census-designated place
- Millington, Oregon, an unincorporated community
- Millington, Tennessee, a city

== Other uses ==
- Millington (surname)
- Millington Glacier, glacier, Antarctica
- Millington and Sons, former English stationery company, 1918 bought by John Dickinson & Co. Ltd
