= Cranford =

Cranford may refer to:

- Cranford (novel), an 1853 novel by Elizabeth Gaskell
  - Cranford (1972 TV series), a 1972 BBC adaptation of the novel
  - Cranford (TV series), a 2007 BBC adaptation of the novel and other works by Elizabeth Gaskell
    - Return to Cranford, a 2009 two-part second season Christmas special of the 2007 TV series

Cranford may also refer to the following places:

- Cranford, Donegal, Ireland, a village
- Cranford, London, England, a suburb near Heathrow
- Cranford, New Jersey, United States
  - Cranford (NJT station), a New Jersey Transit railroad station
- Cranford, Northamptonshire, England, which comprises two villages:
  - Cranford St Andrew
  - Cranford St John
- Cranford, Alberta, Canada, an unincorporated community

== See also ==
- Craanford, County Wexford, Ireland, a village
