= Prestonia, Louisville =

Neighborhood in Louisville, Kentucky

Coordinates: 38.19480°N 85.72690°W

Prestonia is a neighborhood five miles southeast of downtown Louisville, Kentucky, U.S. Its boundaries are Preston Highway, Interstate 65, Interstate 264 and the Norfolk Southern Railway tracks. Many of Prestonia's streets are named after Kentucky counties. It was probably named for the local highway (then called Preston Street Road), which was in turn named after early Louisville landowner Col. William Preston.

== Demographics ==
In the 2000 census, the population was 1,058; of which 95.5% are white, 1.9% are listed as other, 1.5% are black, and 1% are Hispanic. College graduates are 9.7% of the population, people without a high school degree are 25.7%. Males outnumber females 50.2% to 49.8%.
