= Tanglewood (disambiguation) =

Tanglewood is an estate and music venue in Lenox and Stockbridge, Massachusetts.

Tanglewood may also refer to:

== Places ==
=== United States ===
- Tanglewood (Akron, Alabama)
- Tanglewood, Florida
- Tanglewood, Indiana
- Tanglewood (Peewee Valley, Kentucky), 1869, see National Register of Historic Places listings in Oldham County, Kentucky
- Tanglewood (Magnolia, Mississippi), 1850, see National Register of Historic Places listings in Pike County, Mississippi
- Tanglewood (Chillicothe, Ohio), a historic house built in 1850
- Tanglewood Plantation, Lynchburh, South Carolina, 1850, an Historic Place listings in South Carolina
- Tanglewood Historic District, listed on the National Register of Historic Places listings in Davidson County, Tennessee
- Tanglewood, Houston, a neighborhood in Houston, Texas
- Tanglewood (Maidens, Virginia), a historic hotel and tavern built in 1929
- Tanglewood Island, Washington

=== Canada ===
- Tanglewood, Ottawa, a neighbourhood in Ottawa

== Arts, entertainment, and media ==
- Tanglewood Tales (1853), a book by Nathaniel Hawthorne
- Tanglewood (1987 video game)
- "Tanglewood", a first-season episode of CSI: NY
- Tanglewood (2018 video game)

=== Tanglewood Music Festival ===
- Tanglewood Festival Chorus, the official chorus of the Boston Symphony Orchestra and Boston Pops Orchestra
- Tanglewood Music Center, a summer music academy for emerging professional musicians
- Boston University Tanglewood Institute, a summer music training program
- Tanglewood Jazz Festival, a defunct summer music festival

== Other uses ==
- Tukwila (processor), a computer processor once codenamed Tanglewood
- Tanglewood Guitars, a British guitar manufacturer
- Tanglewood Mall, a Virginia shopping mall
- Tanglewood Park, a golf course and park in Forsyth County, North Carolina
- Tanglewood Middle School shooting, a 2022 fatal school shooting Greenville County, South Carolina
