= Crestline =

Crestline may refer to:

== Places in the United States of America ==
- Crestline, a village in Mountain Brook, Alabama
- Crestline, California
- Crestline, Kansas
- Crestline, Ohio

== Other uses ==
- Crestline Coach, a manufacturer of special and emergency vehicles based in Saskatchewan
- Crestline, code name of the Intel Mobile 965 Express chipset, part of Intel's Santa Rosa platform
- Ford Crestline, an automobile produced 1952-54
