= Lakeport =

Lakeport may refer to:

== Places in the United States ==
- Lakeport, California
- Lakeport, Florida
- Lakeport, Michigan
- Lakeport, New Hampshire
- Lakeport, New York, a hamlet in the town of Sullivan, New York
- Lakeport, Texas
- Lakeport, Wisconsin
- Lakeport Township, Hubbard County, Minnesota
- Lakeport, a fictional, presumably Northeastern, city, home of the Bobbsey Twins

== Other ==
- Lakeport Brewing Company, a brewery in Hamilton, Ontario
