= Yamhill =

Yamhill or Yam Hill may refer to:

- Yamhill County, Oregon, a county in Oregon
- Yamhill, Oregon, a city in the western Willamette Valley, located between McMinnville and Forest Grove
- The Yamhill River, a river in northwest Oregon, that flows into the Willamette River
- Yamhill Valley, a valley that contains the Yamhill River
- Yamhill District and Morrison/Southwest 3rd Avenue, a MAX Light Rail station in Portland
- Yamhill, a project code name given by Intel Corporation to the Intel 64 CPU architecture
