= Richford =

Richford may refer to:

== Places ==
=== Canada ===
- Richford, Edmonton, Alberta

=== United States ===
- Richford, New York, a town
- Richford, Vermont, a town
  - Richford (CDP), Vermont, the main settlement in the town
  - East Richford, Vermont, an unincorporated community
- Richford, Wisconsin, a town
  - Richford (community), Wisconsin, an unincorporated community
