= Danbury (disambiguation) =

Danbury is a city in Connecticut, United States.

Danbury may also refer to:

== Places ==
=== United States ===
- Danbury, Iowa, a city
- Danbury, Nebraska, a village
- Danbury, New Hampshire, a town
- Danbury, North Carolina, a city
  - Danbury Township, Stokes County, North Carolina
- Danbury, Ohio, an unincorporated community
  - Danbury Township, Ohio, in Ottawa County
- Danbury, Texas, a city
- Danbury, Wisconsin, a census-designated place

=== Other countries ===
- Danbury, Saskatchewan, Canada, a hamlet
- Danbury, Essex, England, UK, a village

== Other uses ==
- Danbury Municipal Airport, an airport in Danbury, Connecticut
- Danbury Branch, a branch of Metro-North Railroad's New Haven Line
- Danbury station, a Metro-North railroad station in Connecticut
- Greater Danbury, the metropolitan area centered on the city of Danbury, Connecticut

== See also ==
- Federal Correctional Institution, Danbury
- North Danbury station, a proposed Metro-North railroad station in Connecticut
