= Moorestown (computing platform) =

Handheld platform by Intel Corporation

Moorestown is the Intel Corporation's handheld MID and smartphone platform based on Lincroft system-on-a-chip with an Atom processor core, Langwell input/output Platform Controller Hub (I/O PCH), and a Briertown Power Management IC. Announced in 2010, the platform was demonstrated running Moblin Linux.

The Moorestown platform introduced the Simple Firmware Interface (SFI), a lightweight alternative to ACPI. In Linux 5.12, support for SFI, which was previously marked as obsolete, was removed from the kernel by Intel.

== See also ==
- List of Intel Atom microprocessors#"Lincroft" (45 nm)
