= Binary translation =

Form of binary recompilation

In computing, binary translation is a form of binary recompilation in which sequences of instructions (machine code or bytecode) are translated from a source instruction set architecture (ISA) to a target instruction set with respect to the operating system for which the binary was compiled. In some cases, such as instruction set simulation, the target instruction set may be the same as the source instruction set, providing testing and debugging features such as instruction tracing, conditional breakpoints, and hot spot detection and optimization.

The two main types are static and dynamic binary translation. Binary translation is commonly implemented in software using static or dynamic translation techniques.

== Motivation ==
Binary translation can allow software compiled for one instruction set architecture to execute on another without recompiling the original source code, and has been used to migrate existing software between incompatible architectures.

Statically recompiled binaries can avoid the runtime translation overhead incurred by dynamic translation, although the performance of a translated program depends on the translator, source and target architectures, and opportunities for optimization. This is similar to the difference in performance between interpreted and compiled programs in general.

== Static binary translation ==
A translator using static binary translation aims to convert the code of an executable file into code that runs on the target architecture and platform without having to run the code first, as is done in dynamic binary translation. This can be very difficult to do correctly, since not all code can be discovered by the translator. For example, some parts of the executable may be reachable only through indirect branches, whose value is known only at run-time.

One such static binary translator uses universal superoptimizer peephole technology (developed by Sorav Bansal and Alex Aiken from Stanford University) to perform efficient translation between possibly many source and target pairs, with considerably low development costs and high performance of the target binary. In experiments of PowerPC-to-x86 translations, some binaries even outperformed native versions, but on average they ran at two-thirds of native speed.

=== Examples for static binary translations ===
In the 1960s Honeywell provided a program called the Liberator for their Honeywell 200 series of computers; it could translate programs for the IBM 1400 series of computers into programs for the Honeywell 200 series.

In 1995 Norman Ramsey at Bell Communications Research and Mary F. Fernandez at Department of Computer Science, Princeton University developed The New Jersey Machine-Code Toolkit that had the basic tools for static assembly translation.

In 2004 Scott Elliott and Phillip R. Hutchinson at Nintendo developed a tool to generate "C" code from Game Boy binary that could then be compiled for a new platform and linked against a hardware library for use in airline entertainment systems.

In 2014, an ARM architecture version of the 1998 video game StarCraft was generated by static recompilation and additional reverse engineering of the original x86 version. The Pandora handheld community developed the required tools on their own and achieved usable translations several times.

Another example is the NES-to-x86 statically recompiled version of the videogame Super Mario Bros. which was generated using LLVM in 2013.

For instance, a successful x86-to-x64 static recompilation was generated for the procedural terrain generator of the video game Cube World in 2014.

In the 2020s, static binary translation tools such as N64 Recomp were developed to automatically recompile Nintendo 64 executables into native C code, enabling modern PC builds with features such as arbitrary frame rates and widescreen support.

== Dynamic binary translation ==
Dynamic binary translation (DBT) translates binary code during program execution. A common implementation translates source code in units such as basic blocks and stores the generated target code in a code cache so that previously translated blocks can be reused.

Dynamic binary translation differs from simple emulation because translated target instructions can subsequently execute directly from the code cache. Translation itself imposes a run-time cost, and DBT systems attempt to amortize this overhead by reusing translated code, particularly for frequently executed regions.

More advanced dynamic translators employ dynamic recompilation, using execution information to identify frequently executed regions and apply additional optimization. This approach is similar to just-in-time compilation, although binary translators operate on already compiled machine code rather than source code or a language-level intermediate representation.

=== Examples for dynamic binary translations in software ===
Pioneering works include Shade (the fast instruction set simulator and custom trace generator originally developed by Bob Cmelik (Sun Microsystems) and David Keppel (University of Washington))., open-source DAISY (Dynamically Architected Instruction Set from Yorktown) and its successor BOA (Binary-translation and Optimization Architecture) from IBM Research, and the Code Morphing Software used in Transmeta processors.

- Apple Computer implemented a dynamic translating emulator for M68K code in their PowerPC line of Macintoshes, which achieved a very high level of reliability, performance, and compatibility (see Mac 68K emulator). This allowed Apple to bring the machines to market with only a partially native operating system, and end users could adopt the new, faster architecture without risking their investment in software. Partly because the emulator was so successful, many parts of the operating system remained emulated. A full transition to a PowerPC native operating system (OS) was not made until the release of Mac OS X (10.0) in 2001. (The Mac OS X "Classic" runtime environment continued to offer this emulation capability on PowerPC Macs until Mac OS X 10.5.)
- Mac OS X 10.4.4 for Intel-based Macs introduced the Rosetta dynamic translation layer to ease Apple's transition from PPC-based hardware to x86. Developed for Apple by Transitive Corporation, the Rosetta software is an implementation of Transitive's QuickTransit solution.
- QuickTransit during its product lifespan also provided SPARC→x86, x86→PowerPC and MIPS→Itanium 2 translation support.
- DEC achieved similar success with its translation tools to help users migrate from the CISC VAX architecture to the Alpha RISC architecture.
- HP ARIES (Automatic Re-translation and Integrated Environment Simulation) is a software dynamic binary translation system that combines fast code interpretation with two phase dynamic translation to transparently and accurately execute HP 9000 HP-UX applications on HP-UX 11i for HPE Integrity Servers. The ARIES fast interpreter emulates a complete set of non-privileged PA-RISC instructions with no user intervention. During interpretation, it monitors the application's execution pattern and translates only the frequently executed code into native Itanium code at runtime. ARIES implements two phase dynamic translation, a technique in which translated code in first phase collects runtime profile information which is used during second phase translation to further optimize the translated code. ARIES stores the dynamically translated code in memory buffer called code cache. Further references to translated basic blocks execute directly in the code cache and do not require additional interpretation or translation. The targets of translated code blocks are back-patched to ensure execution takes place in code cache most of the time. At the end of the emulation, ARIES discards all the translated code without modifying the original application. The ARIES emulation engine also implements Environment Emulation which emulates an HP 9000 HP-UX application's system calls, signal delivery, exception management, threads management, emulation of HP GDB for debugging, and core file creation for the application.
- DEC created the FX!32 binary translator for converting x86 applications to Alpha applications.
- Sun Microsystems' Wabi software included dynamic translation from x86 to SPARC instructions.
- In January 2000, Transmeta Corporation announced a novel processor design named Crusoe. From the FAQ on their web site,

The smart microprocessor consists of a hardware VLIW core as its engine and a software layer called Code Morphing software. The Code Morphing software acts as a shell [...] morphing or translating x86 instructions to native Crusoe instructions. In addition, the Code Morphing software contains a dynamic compiler and code optimizer [...] The result is increased performance at the least amount of power. [...] [This] allows Transmeta to evolve the VLIW hardware and Code Morphing software separately without affecting the huge base of software applications.

- Intel Corporation developed and implemented an IA-32 Execution Layer - a dynamic binary translator designed to support IA-32 applications on Itanium-based systems, which was included in Microsoft Windows Server for Itanium architecture, as well as in several flavors of Linux, including Red Hat and Suse. It allowed IA-32 applications to run faster than they would using the native IA-32 mode on Itanium processors.
- Dolphin (an emulator for the GameCube/Wii) performs JIT recompilation of PowerPC code to x86 and AArch64.
- Microsoft Virtual PC supports binary translation for 32-bit guest operating systems.
- VMware Workstation 12 or earlier are known to support binary translation for 32-bit guest operating systems.

=== Examples for dynamic binary translations in hardware ===
- Nvidia Tegra K1 Denver translates ARM instructions over a slow hardware decoder to its native microcode instructions and uses a software binary translator for hot code.

== See also ==
- Binary optimization
- Binary recompilation
- Comparison of platform virtualization software
- Dynamic recompilation
- Emulator
- Instruction set simulator
- Just-in-time compilation
- Shadow memory
- Virtual machine
