= IBM COBOL =

COBOL compiler

IBM COBOL compiler
- IBM COBOL language manual with OS/VS compiler extensions, 1975
- Developer: IBM
- Operating system: Cross-platform
- Available in: Multilingual
- Type: Software development
- License: Proprietary
- Website: https://www.ibm.com/products/cobol-compiler-family

IBM has offered the computer programming language COBOL on many platforms, starting with the IBM 1400 series and IBM 7000 series, continuing into the industry-dominant IBM System/360 and IBM System/370 mainframe systems, and then through IBM Power Systems (AIX), IBM Z (z/OS and z/VSE), and x86 (Linux).

At the height of COBOL usage in the 1960s through 1980s, the IBM COBOL product was the most important of any industry COBOL compilers. In his popular textbook A Simplified Guide to Structured COBOL Programming, Daniel D. McCracken tries to make the treatment general for any machine and compiler, but when he gives details for a particular one, they are to the IBM COBOL compiler and for a System/370. Similarly, another popular textbook of the time, Stern and Stern's Structured COBOL Programming, tries to present an implementation-independent explanation of the language, but the appendix giving the full syntax of the language is explicitly for IBM COBOL, with its extensions to the language highlighted.

Use of IBM COBOL was so widespread that Capex Corporation, an independent software vendor, made a post-code generation phase object code optimizer for it. The Capex Optimizer became a quite successful product.

Although the IBM COBOL Compiler Family web site only mentions AIX, Linux, and z/OS, IBM still offers COBOL on z/VM and z/VSE.

== Products ==
The current IBM COBOL compiler family consists of the following products:

- Enterprise COBOL for z/OS
- COBOL for AIX
- COBOL for Linux on x86
- Automatic Binary Optimizer for z/OS (ABO)
- COBOL for OS/390 & VM
- COBOL for VSE/ESA
- Development Studio for i

== IBM COBOL compiler name, version, release, product numbers, GA and EOS dates ==
Compiler	Release level	Product number	General availability (GA) date (Year-Month-Day)	End of support (EOS) date (Year-Month-Day)
OS COBOL E		360S-C0-503	?	?
OS COBOL F		360S-CB-524	?	?
OS American National Standard COBOL (COBOL U)	Versions 1-2	360S-CB-545	?	?
OS Full American National Standard COBOL	Versions 1-3	5734-CB1	?	?
OS Full American National Standard COBOL	Versions 4-5	5734-CB2	?	?
OS/VS COBOL	Version 1 Release 2 Modification 3	5740-CB1	1974-09-23	1999-12-31
OS/VS COBOL	Version 1 Release 2 Modification 4	5740-CB1	1976-09-23	1999-12-31
VS COBOL II	Version 1 Release 3	5668-958	1988-12-16	1996-06-30
VS COBOL II	Version 1 Release 4	5668-958	1993-03-12	2001-03-31
COBOL/370	Version 1 Release 1	5688-197	1991-12-20	1997-09-30
COBOL for MVS & VM	Version 1 Release 2	5688-197	1995-10-27	2001-12-31
COBOL for OS/390 & VM	Version 2 Release 1	5648-A25	1997-05-23	2004-12-31
COBOL for OS/390 & VM	Version 2 Release 2	5648-A25	2000-09-29	2004-12-31
Enterprise COBOL for z/OS	Version 3 Release 1	5655-G53	2001-11-30	2004-04-04
Enterprise COBOL for z/OS	Version 3 Release 2	5655-G53	2002-09-27	2005-10-03
Enterprise COBOL for z/OS	Version 3 Release 3	5655-G53	2004-02-27	2007-04-30
Enterprise COBOL for z/OS	Version 3 Release 4	5655-G53	2005-07-01	2015-04-30
Enterprise COBOL for z/OS	Version 4 Release 1	5655-S71	2007-12-14	2014-04-30
Enterprise COBOL for z/OS	Version 4 Release 2	5655-S71	2009-08-28	2022-04-30
Enterprise COBOL for z/OS	Version 5 Release 1	5655-W32	2013-06-21	2020-04-30
Enterprise COBOL for z/OS	Version 5 Release 2	5655-W32	2015-02-27	2020-04-30
Enterprise COBOL Value Unit Edition for z/OS^{1}	Version 5 Release 2	5697-ECV	2015-10-06	2020-04-30
Enterprise COBOL for z/OS	Version 6 Release 1	5655-EC6	2016-03-18	2022-09-30
Enterprise COBOL Value Unit Edition for z/OS^{1}	Version 6 Release 1	5697-V61	2016-03-18	2022-09-30
Enterprise COBOL for z/OS	Version 6 Release 2	5655-EC6	2017-09-08	2024-09-30
Enterprise COBOL Value Unit Edition for z/OS^{1}	Version 6 Release 2	5697-V61	2017-09-08	2024-09-30
Enterprise COBOL for z/OS	Version 6 Release 3	5655-EC6	2019-09-06	Not announced yet
Enterprise COBOL Value Unit Edition for z/OS^{1}	Version 6 Release 3	5697-V61	2019-09-06	Not announced yet
Enterprise COBOL for z/OS	Version 6 Release 4	5655-EC6	2022-05-27	Not announced yet
Enterprise COBOL Value Unit Edition for z/OS^{1}	Version 6 Release 4	5697-V61	2022-05-27	Not announced yet
COBOL for Linux on x86	Version 1 Release 1	5737-L11	2021-04-16	Not announced yet
COBOL for Linux on x86	Version 1 Release 2	5737-L11	2023-06-09	Not announced yet
Note: 1. Enterprise COBOL Value Unit Edition for z/OS is the same as Enterprise COBOL for z/OS made available under a different product number and pricing metric.

Check the lifecycle details (lifecycle dates, announcement letters, and other information) for Enterprise COBOL for z/OS products.
