= Peephole optimization =

Compiler optimization technique

Peephole optimization is an optimization technique performed on a small set of compiler-generated instructions, known as a peephole or window, that involves replacing the instructions with a logically equivalent set that has better performance.

For example:

- Instead of pushing a register onto the stack and then immediately popping the value back into the register, remove both instructions.
- Instead of multiplying x by 2, do x << 1.
- Instead of multiplying a floating-point register by 8, add 3 to the floating-point register's exponent.

The term peephole optimization was introduced by William Marshall McKeeman in 1965.

== Replacements ==
Peephole optimization replacements include but are not limited to:

- Null sequences – delete useless operations.
- Combine operations – replace several operations with one equivalent.
- Algebraic laws – use algebraic laws to simplify or reorder instructions.
- Special-case instructions – use instructions designed for special operand cases.
- Address-mode operations – use address modes to simplify code.

== Implementation ==
Modern compilers often implement peephole optimizations with a pattern-matching algorithm.

== Examples ==
=== Replacing slow instructions with faster ones ===
The following Java bytecode:

aload 1
aload 1
mul

can be replaced with the following, which executes faster:

aload 1
dup
mul

As for most peephole optimizations, this is based on the relative efficiency of different instructions. In this case, dup (which duplicates and pushes the top of the stack) is known/assumed to be more efficient than aload (which loads a local variable and pushes it onto the stack).

=== Removing redundant code ===
The following source code:

a = b + c;
d = a + e;

is straightforwardly compiled to

MOV b, R0  ; Copy b to the register
ADD c, R0  ; Add  c to the register, the register is now b+c
MOV R0, a  ; Copy the register to a
MOV a, R0  ; Copy a to the register
ADD e, R0  ; Add  e to the register, the register is now a+e [(b+c)+e]
MOV R0, d  ; Copy the register to d

but can be optimized to

MOV b, R0  ; Copy b to the register
ADD c, R0  ; Add c to the register, which is now b+c (a)
MOV R0, a  ; Copy the register to a
ADD e, R0  ; Add e to the register, which is now b+c+e [(a)+e]
MOV R0, d  ; Copy the register to d

=== Removing redundant stack instructions ===
If the compiler saves registers on the stack before calling a subroutine and restores them when returning, consecutive calls to subroutines may have redundant stack instructions.

Suppose the compiler generates the following Z80 instructions for each procedure call:

PUSH AF
PUSH BC
PUSH DE
PUSH HL
CALL _ADDR
POP HL
POP DE
POP BC
POP AF

If there were two consecutive subroutine calls, they would look like this:

PUSH AF
PUSH BC
PUSH DE
PUSH HL
CALL _ADDR1
POP HL
POP DE
POP BC
POP AF
PUSH AF
PUSH BC
PUSH DE
PUSH HL
CALL _ADDR2
POP HL
POP DE
POP BC
POP AF

The sequence POP regs followed by PUSH for the same registers is generally redundant. In cases where it is redundant, a peephole optimization would remove these instructions. In the example, this would cause another redundant POP/PUSH pair to appear in the peephole, and these would be removed in turn. Assuming that subroutine _ADDR2 does not depend on previous register values, removing all of the redundant code in the example above would eventually leave the following code:

PUSH AF
PUSH BC
PUSH DE
PUSH HL
CALL _ADDR1
CALL _ADDR2
POP HL
POP DE
POP BC
POP AF

== See also ==
- Object code optimizers, discussion in relation to general algorithmic efficiency
- Capex Corporation – produced the COBOL optimizer, an early mainframe object code optimizer for IBM Cobol
- Superoptimization
- Digital Research XLT86, an optimizing assembly source-to-source compiler
