= Dynamic translation =

Dynamic translation may refer to:

- Dynamic and formal equivalence, in translating
- Dynamic recompilation, in computer science
