= Yixin Diao =

American electrical engineer

Yixin Diao is an electrical engineer at the IBM Watson Research Center in Yorktown Heights, New York, USA. He was named a Fellow of the Institute of Electrical and Electronics Engineers (IEEE) in 2016 for his contributions to modeling, optimization and control of computing systems.
