= Simtek Corporation =

Flash memory development company

Simtek Integrated Memories Corporation
- Company type: Public company
- Industry: Semiconductors
- Founded: 1987
- Fate: acquired
- Headquarters: Colorado Springs, United States
- Products: memory chips
- Parent: Cypress Semiconductor

Simtek Corporation, headquartered in Colorado Springs, CO, was an early leader in the development of SONOS memory technology which it used in its nvSRAM product line which featured a SONOS Flash memory coupled with an SRAM shadow memory to achieve both speed and non-volatility. The company was acquired by Cypress Semiconductor in September 2008. Simtek was a fabless company that relied on wafer foundry manufacturing support from Chartered Semiconductor, DongBu HiTek, and Cypress.

== History ==
Simtek Corporation was founded in 1987 in Colorado Springs, Colorado. The company sold a product called the NOVRAM (nonvolatile RAM) a Non-volatile random-access memory that combined a shadow-RAM (SRAM) with an EEPROM. It was designed to allow the SRAM to operate (at high SRAM speeds) for most of the time, but when it received a signal (usually sent by the system when a power failure was imminent) the entire contents of the SRAM were copied into the EEPROM at a very high speed thanks to the internal parallelism of the device.

== Business affairs ==
In March 1991 Simtek went public, trading on the NASDAQ under the symbol 'SMTK". Harold A. Blomquist became CEO in 2005 replacing Douglas Mitchell who had served for seven years.

The company was acquired in September 2008 by Cypress Semiconductor in a deal valued at $46M. In the quarter immediately before it was acquired, Simtek posted revenues of $7.5M and a net loss of $2.7M. Cypress pledged to continue to support Simtek's product line after the acquisition.

In 2008 the company re-branded as AgigA Tech Inc.
