= Helgrind =

Helgrind may refer to:

- Helgrind, the main entrance to Hel in Norse mythology
- Helgrind, a part of the computer programming tool Valgrind
- Helgrind, a mountain in the Inheritance cycle
