= Libumem =

libumem is a memory allocator userspace library used to manage memory allocation, and may be used to detect memory management bugs in applications. It is based on the Slab allocator concept. Libumem is available as a standard part of Solaris from Solaris 9 Update 3 onwards.

== Functions ==
Functions in this library provide fast, scalable object-caching memory allocation with multithreaded application support. In addition to the standard malloc(3C) family of functions and the more flexible umem_alloc(3MALLOC) family, libumem provides powerful object-caching services as described in umem_cache_create(3MALLOC).

Getting started with libumem is easy; just set LD_PRELOAD to "libumem.so" and any program executed will use libumem's malloc(3C) and free(3C) (or new and delete). This slab allocator is designed for systems with many threads and many CPUs. Memory allocation with naive allocators can be a serious bottleneck.

== See also ==
- Valgrind

== Sources ==
- Portable Umem: An opensource effort to port libumem to other UNIX-like systems
