= Capex Corporation =

American software company (1969–1982)

- Type: Private
- Industry: Computer software
- Founded: 1969
- Fate: Acquired by Computer Associates in 1982
- Headquarters: Phoenix, Arizona, United States
- Key people: A. LeRoy Ellison
- Products: Compiler optimizers; early spreadsheets; system utilities
- Number of employees: 40 (1976); 100 (1978); 260 (1982)

Capex Corporation was an American computer software company in existence from 1969 through 1982 and based in Phoenix, Arizona. It made a variety of software products, mostly system utilities for the IBM mainframe platform, and was known for its Optimizer add-on to the IBM COBOL compiler. Capex was acquired by Computer Associates in 1982.

== Origins ==
The company was begun as a start-up in August 1969. In all there were eight original employees, with funding coming from venture capital. Some of the founders had been working for General Electric's computer division in Phoenix, on systems such as the GE-600 series. There, as a 1990 profile in the Phoenix Business Journal of one of them stated, they "encountered the types of limitations that would encourage him and countless other engineers and technical people to venture off and start their own businesses". Among these founders were A. LeRoy Ellison (1936–2017), who became president of the new company, and Harry N. Cantrell (1924–2004). Other original employees had been working on Univac systems.

In putting out mainframe computer systems, General Electric, like other hardware vendors of the time, was providing software without cost to its customers. The Capex founders thought that hardware companies failed to have a sufficient understanding of the software world and that, as a consequence, there was a viable market to be found for an independent software company. This was especially the case following IBM's decision to unbundle software from its mainframes in 1969, which happened but two months after the founding of Capex. Capex became one of the first companies to capitalize on that change in the marketplace. Initially, they intended to offer products for multiple vendors' platforms but soon found that economically it made sense to focus only on the dominant IBM mainframe.

Early executives of Capex Corporation included Russell E. Edwards and John J. Anderson. The office for the company was located on 3rd Street, in the Midtown Phoenix neighborhood near the Central Avenue Corridor. The company said that it became profitable during 1971.

== Products ==
By 1976, Capex Corporation employed forty people, had sales offices in various cities in the United States and Canada, and had resellers overseas. Capex's products were focused on IBM's OS/MVS/VS1/SVS operating system and they benefited from having a sales force dedicated to selling on and for that platform. The company began to grow rapidly. By 1978, they had around 100 employees and began building a new $2 million, 36,000-square-foot (3,300 m^{2}) dedicated building for the company, with room to at least double its size. The new office, further north and east in Midtown at 14th Street and Indian School Road, replaced the 3rd Street office and a second facility on Thomas Road.

The company offered both system software products and application software products.

=== Optimizer ===
The COBOL (English-like programming language) Optimizer was first released in late 1970 and soon achieved visibility within the computing industry. The Optimizer was a special kind of optimizing compiler, that being a post-code generation-phase object code optimizer for the IBM COBOL compiler. The product acted in part as a peephole optimizer, replacing code sequences generated by the IBM compiler with shorter or faster sequences that had the same semantic effect. These transformations also included avoiding loads from main memory into registers and improving how COBOL PERFORM statements were implemented.

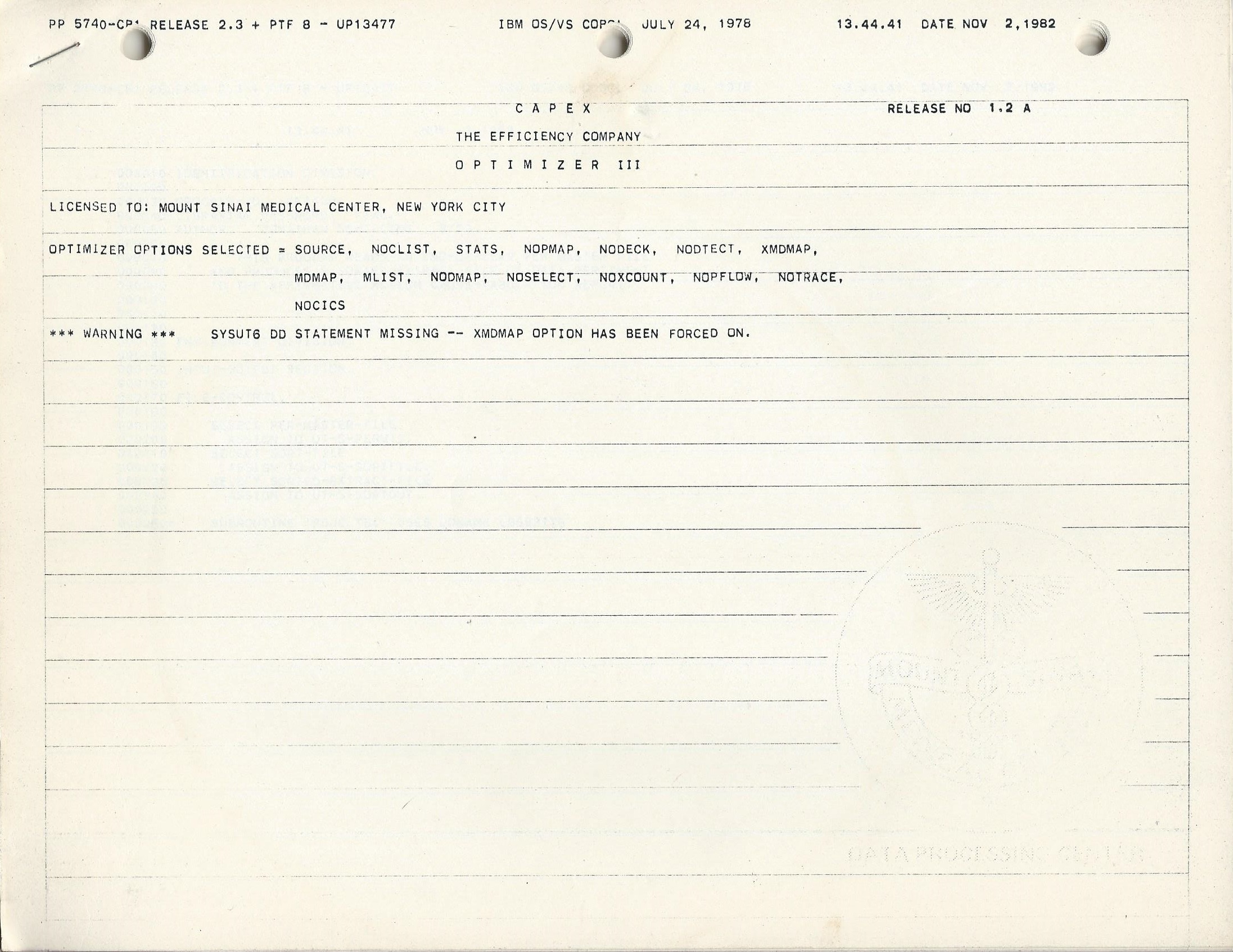
Printout banner page for the Capex Optimizer III

The Optimizer ran during a batch compilation job, after the IBM compiler had generated object code, and was packaged so that it was essentially transparent to the programmer. In the best case, its transformations could bring about a significant savings in machine instruction time at runtime. One early customer, Ford Motor Company, verified assertions that execution-time savings could be on the order of 10–15 percent, while savings in the memory size of compiled programs could be up to 20–30 percent.

In addition to performance improvements, the Optimizer could perform a static control flow analysis of the executable code within the COBOL procedure division and identify unreachable code. The Optimizer III version of the product could additionally be present during test executions of the program and do path coverage analysis as well as report profiling of execution counts and timings.

The Optimizer was on Datapro Research Corporation's honor roll of software packages for four years. (Computer Associates later released a follow-on product called CA-OPTIMIZER II for MVS.)

=== AutoTab ===
In 1972, Capex announced the availability of its AutoTab financial planning product, on both the IBM 360/370 platform and on the Honeywell 6000 series, which was a rebadging of the GE-600 series. AutoTab was used in finance departments of some customers as an easier alternative to programming on their own and less expensive than time-sharing solutions. In 1975, Autotab-II was described as extending the original support for up to a 250 × 250 matrix to a maximum of 1500 × 1500, "combined in any proportion the user requires..." Viewed as decision support system products, Autotab 300 and Autotab 3000 were still in use in the early 1980s. Autotab can be seen as an early form of spreadsheet, albeit a batch-oriented spreadsheet, that lent itself towards sophisticated financial planning uses.

=== Other products ===
In addition to the Optimizer and AutoTab, the company put out a variety of other software products. These included:

- PLAN IV:MVS – system management and planning, bottleneck identification
- TLMS II – Tape Library Management System for IBM mainframe OS/MVS environments (this tape library management product was subsequently renamed to CA-DYNAM/TLMS by Computer Associates)
- The Scheduler – Batch job scheduling product for mainframe OS/MVS environments (this was not the original version of Computer Associates' job scheduling product, CA-SCHEDULER 7.0, which was written from scratch by CA and released in 1985 for the OS/MVS, DOS/VSE and VM/CMS operating systems)
- Manage:DASD – Software to accommodate Direct Access Storage Device maintenance on OS/MVS systems
- EZTEST – interactive debugging tool for CICS teleprocessing monitor on IBM mainframe systems (actually released a couple of months after the acquisition by Computer Associates).
- COTUNE II – A program which assisted with optimization of COBOL code. The input was COBOL source code from a program, and the output was a revised version of the program which, when compiled and run, produced as output a copy of the original source code along with numbers showing how many times each line had actually executed during operation. This allowed a programmer to look for dead code (lines which ran 0 times) and also allowed a programmer to optimize code for the lines which ran the most times.

== Fate ==
Capex Corporation continued to grow and by 1982 employed 260 people, while remaining privately held. It was announced in June 1982 that the company would be acquired by the Long Island firm, Computer Associates International, Inc. (CA). Computer Associates would gain all of the stock of Capex in return for shares of Computer Associates valued at $22.5 million. (Note: An amount which has sometimes been simplified to $22 million.) The deal was completed in August 1982.

The acquisition happened even though Computer Associates was only slightly larger than Capex at the time. The deal has sometimes been referred to as a merger, and following its completion, CA's sales became half again larger. After the combining, 30 people from Capex were laid off.

Capex continued to operate as a division of Computer Associates from their 14th Street Phoenix office until 1984 at the latest, when the remaining employees moved southward to an office near Interstate 10 and 24th Street, at which point the Computer Associates had fully subsumed the Capex brand.

The acquisition of Capex was generally viewed as having been successful. It was the start of what was to become a buying spree for Computer Associates over the next several years, a spree that under chief Charles B. Wang would result in CA becoming one of the largest software companies in the world.

After selling, Capex founder Ellison went on to become a leading figure in Arizona entrepreneurial circles.
