= CA/EZTEST =

Computer Debug Software Package

CA-EZTEST was a CICS interactive test/debug software package distributed by Computer Associates and originally called EZTEST/CICS, produced by Capex Corporation of Phoenix, Arizona with assistance from Ken Dakin from England.

The product provided source level test and debugging features for computer programs written in COBOL, PL/I and Assembler (BAL) languages to complement their own existing COBOL optimizer product.

== Competition ==
CA-EZTEST initially competed with three rival products:

- "Intertest" originally from On-line Software International, based in the United States. In 1991, Computer Associates International, Inc. acquired On-line Software and renamed the product CA-INTERTEST, then stopped selling CA-EZTEST.
- OLIVER (CICS interactive test/debug) from Advanced Programming Techniques in the UK.
- XPEDITER from Compuware Corporation who in 1994 acquired the OLIVER product.

== Early critical role ==
Between them, these three products provided much needed third-party system software support for IBM's "flagship" teleprocessing product CICS, which survived for more than 20 years as a strategic product without any memory protection of its own. A single "rogue" application program (frequently by a buffer overflow) could accidentally overwrite data almost anywhere in the address space causing "down-time" for the entire teleprocessing system, possibly supporting thousands of remote terminals. This was despite the fact that much of the world's banking and other commerce relied heavily on CICS for secure transaction processing between 1970 and early 1990s. The difficulty in deciding which application program caused the problem was often insurmountable and frequently the system would be restarted without spending many hours investigated very large (and initially unformatted) "core dump"s requiring expert system programming support and knowledge.

== Early integrated testing environment ==
Additionally, the product (and its competitors) provided an integrated testing environment which was not provided by IBM for early versions of CICS and which was only partially satisfied with their later embedded testing tool — "Execution Diagnostic Facility" (EDF), which only helped newer "Command level" programmers and provided no protection.

== Supported operating systems ==
The following operating systems were supported:

- IBM MVS
- IBM XA
- IBM VSE (except XPEDITER)
