= VOGL =

OpenGL debugger

- Original authors: RAD Game Tools and Valve
- Release: March 12, 2014; 12 years ago
- Written in: C++
- Operating system: Linux, Microsoft Windows
- Type: Debugger
- License: MIT License
- Repository: vogl on GitHub

Mesa 3D comprises an implementation of OpenGL as well as the user-space device drivers. There are additional components inside the Linux kernel: the DRM and the KMS.

VOGL is a debugger for the OpenGL rendering API intended to be used in the development of video games. VOGL was originally written at RAD Game Tools and Valve. VOGL is free and open-source software subject to the terms of the MIT License.

== Description ==
There is a graphical front-end implementing Qt5-based GUI widgets.

VOGL was initially released with support for Linux operating systems only, but on April 23, 2014, additional support for Microsoft Windows was released.

Goals included:

- Free and open-source
- Steam integration
- Vendor and driver version neutral
- No special app builds needed
- Frame capturing, full stream tracing, trace trimming
- Optimized replayer
- OpenGL usage validation
- Regression testing, benchmarking
- Robust API support: OpenGL v3/4.x, core or compatibility contexts
- UI to edit captures, inspect state, diff snapshots, control tracing

VOGLperf is a benchmarking tool for Linux OpenGL games.

== See also ==
- Valgrind
- Linux gaming
