= FX!32 =

Emulator to run x86 code on Alpha processors

FX!32 is a software emulator program that allows Win32 programs built for the Intel x86 instruction set to execute on DEC Alpha-based systems running Windows NT. Released in 1996, FX!32 was developed by Digital Equipment Corporation (DEC) to support their Alpha microprocessors. At the time, there was a belief that RISC-based microprocessors were likely to replace x86-based microprocessors, due to a more efficient and simplified implementation that could reach higher clock frequencies. The one thing that held the Alpha back was application-compatibility with existing Win32 x86 applications.

Emulation had been around for a while as a concept, but FX!32 went one stage further. It analyzed the way programs worked and, after the program ran, used binary translation to produce dynamic-link library (DLL) files of native Alpha code that the application could execute the next time it ran. This way even in the early 1.0 release, the FX!32 achieved speeds for Win32 x86 applications that ran 40-50% as fast as native x86 code, with a 70% speed projected as likely with improved optimization. Version 1.5, released by Compaq in 1999, added support for the Alpha 21264 (EV6) CPU, including emulation of Intel's MMX instruction set.

Maurice Marks served as manager of the technical team. Eric Perkins provided the primary information on Windows NT, and wrote a runtime system to allow binary translated application to run on Intel Windows NT based machines.

A prototype of the system was demonstrated at COMDEX in 1993.
