= Dynamic recompilation =

On-the-fly translation of code between CPUs

In computer science, dynamic recompilation is a feature of some emulators and virtual machines, where the system may recompile some part of a program during execution. By compiling during execution, the system can tailor the generated code to reflect the program's run-time environment, and potentially produce more efficient code by exploiting information that is not available to a traditional static compiler.

== Uses ==
Most dynamic recompilers are used to convert machine code between architectures at runtime. This is a task often needed in the emulation of legacy gaming platforms. In other cases, a system may employ dynamic recompilation as part of an adaptive optimization strategy to execute a portable program representation such as Java or .NET Common Language Runtime bytecodes. Full-speed debuggers also utilize dynamic recompilation to reduce the space overhead incurred in most deoptimization techniques, and other features such as dynamic thread migration.

== Tasks ==
The main tasks a dynamic recompiler has to perform are:

- Reading in machine code from the source platform
- Emitting machine code for the target platform

A dynamic recompiler may also perform some auxiliary tasks:

- Managing a cache of recompiled code
- Updating of elapsed cycle counts on platforms with cycle count registers
- Management of interrupt checking
- Providing an interface to virtualized support hardware, for example a GPU
- Optimizing higher-level code structures to run efficiently on the target hardware (see below)

== Applications ==
- Many Java virtual machines feature dynamic recompilation.
- Apple's Rosetta for macOS on x86 allows PowerPC code to be run on the x86 architecture. Similarly, Apple's Rosetta 2 for macOS on Apple silicon permits many applications compiled for x86-64-based processors to be translated for execution on Apple silicon.
- Later versions of the Mac 68K emulator used in classic Mac OS allow running 680x0 code on the PowerPC hardware.
- The HP Dynamo project, an example of a transparent binary dynamic optimizer.
- DynamoRIO, an open-source successor to Dynamo that works with the ARM, x86-64 and IA-64 (Itanium) instruction sets.
- The Vx32 virtual machine employs dynamic recompilation to create OS-independent x86 architecture sandboxes for safe application plugins.
- The backwards compatibility functionality of the Xbox 360 (i.e. running games written for the original Xbox) is widely assumed to use dynamic recompilation.
- Many emulators for video game consoles, such as PCSX2, PPSSPP., and melonDS use JIT dynamic recompilation.

== See also ==
- Binary recompiler
- Binary translation
- Comparison of platform virtualization software
- Just-in-time compilation
- Instrumentation (computer programming)
