= Instrumentation (computer programming) =

Modification of software to allow for analysis

In computer programming, instrumentation is the act of modifying software so that analysis can be performed on it.

Generally, instrumentation either modifies source code or binary code. Execution environments like the JVM provide separate interfaces to add instrumentation to program executions, such as the JVMTI, which enables instrumentation during program start.

Instrumentation enables profiling: measuring dynamic behavior during a test run. This is useful for properties of a program that cannot be analyzed statically with sufficient precision, such as performance and alias analysis.

Instrumentation can include:

- Logging events such as failures and operation start and end
- Measuring and logging the duration of operations

== Limitations ==
Instrumentation is limited by execution coverage. If the program never reaches a particular point of execution, then instrumentation at that point collects no data. For instance, if a word processor application is instrumented, but the user never activates the print feature, then the instrumentation can say nothing about the routines which are used exclusively by the printing feature.

Instrumentation increases the execution time of a program. In some contexts, this increase might be dramatic and hence limit the application of instrumentation to debugging contexts. The instrumentation overhead differs depending on the used instrumentation technology.

== See also ==
- Hooking – range of techniques used to alter or augment the behavior of an operating system, of applications, or of other software components by intercepting function calls or messages or events passed between software components.
- Instruction set simulator – simulation of all instructions at machine code level to provide instrumentation
- Runtime intelligence – technologies, managed services and practices for the collection, integration, analysis, and presentation of application usage levels, patterns, and practices.
- Software performance analysis – techniques to monitor code performance, including instrumentation.
- Hardware performance counter
- DTrace – A comprehensive dynamic tracing framework for troubleshooting kernel and application problems on production systems in real time, implemented in Solaris, macOS, FreeBSD, and many other platforms and products.
- Java Management Extensions (JMX) – Java technology for managing and monitoring applications, system objects, devices (such as printers), and service-oriented networks.
- Application Response Measurement – standardized instrumentation API for C and Java.
- Dynamic recompilation – a feature of some emulators and virtual machines where the system may recompile some part of a program during execution.
