= List of Intel Itanium processors =

The Itanium from Intel is a high-end server and supercomputer microprocessor.

== Itanium (2001) ==
=== Merced (180 nm) ===
Steppings: C0, C1 and C2. CPUID: 0007000604h (stepping C0), 0007000704h (stepping C1) or 0007000804h (stepping C2). Transistor count: 25.4 million for CPU, 295 million for the external L3 cache. The FSB data bus is 64 bits wide, not 128 like in Itanium 2.

Model	S-Spec number	Clock speed	Cache		FSB speed	Cores (Threads)	Voltage	TDP (W)	Socket	Release date	Price
Model	S-Spec number	Clock speed	L2	L3	FSB speed	Cores (Threads)	Voltage	TDP (W)	Socket	Release date	Price
Itanium 733 MHz 2 MB	SL4LT	733 MHz	96 KB	2 MB	266 MT/s	1 (1)	1.25–1.6 V	116	PAC418	2001-05-29	$1,177
Itanium 733 MHz 2 MB	SL5VS	733 MHz	96 KB	2 MB	266 MT/s	1 (1)	1.25–1.6 V	116	PAC418	2001-05-29	$1,177
Itanium 733 MHz 2 MB	SL6RH	733 MHz	96 KB	2 MB	266 MT/s	1 (1)	1.25–1.6 V	116	PAC418	2001-05-29	$1,177
Itanium 733 MHz 4 MB	SL4LS	733 MHz	96 KB	4 MB	266 MT/s	1 (1)	1.25–1.6 V	130	PAC418	2001-05-29	$4,227
Itanium 733 MHz 4 MB	SL5VT	733 MHz	96 KB	4 MB	266 MT/s	1 (1)	1.25–1.6 V	130	PAC418	2001-05-29	$4,227
Itanium 800 MHz 2 MB	SL4LR	800 MHz	96 KB	2 MB	266 MT/s	1 (1)	1.25–1.6 V	116	PAC418	2001-05-29	$1,980
Itanium 800 MHz 2 MB	SL5VU	800 MHz	96 KB	2 MB	266 MT/s	1 (1)	1.25–1.6 V	116	PAC418	2001-05-29	$1,980
Itanium 800 MHz 2 MB	SL6RK	800 MHz	96 KB	2 MB	266 MT/s	1 (1)	1.25–1.6 V	116	PAC418	2001-05-29	$1,980
Itanium 800 MHz 4 MB	SL4LQ	800 MHz	96 KB	4 MB	266 MT/s	1 (1)	1.25–1.6 V	130	PAC418	2001-05-29	$4,227
Itanium 800 MHz 4 MB	SL5VW	800 MHz	96 KB	4 MB	266 MT/s	1 (1)	1.25–1.6 V	130	PAC418	2001-05-29	$4,227
Itanium 800 MHz 4 MB	SL6RL	800 MHz	96 KB	4 MB	266 MT/s	1 (1)	1.25–1.6 V	130	PAC418	2001-05-29	$4,227

== Itanium 2 (2002-2007) ==
Itanium 2 uses socket PAC611 with a 128 bit wide FSB. The 90 nm CPUs (9000 and 9100 series) bring dual-core chips and an updated microarchitecture adding multithreading and splitting the L2 cache into a 256 KB data cache and 1 MB instruction cache per core (the pre-9000 series L2 cache being a 256 KB common cache). All Itaniums except some 130 nm models are capable of >2-socket SMP.

=== McKinley (180 nm) ===
Stepping: B3. Die size: 421 mm^{2}. Transistor count: 221 million. CPUID: 001F000704h

Model (Note: The official full names: Intel® Itanium® 2 Processor 900 MHz with 1.5 MB L3 Cache Intel® Itanium® 2 Processor 1.0 GHz with 1.5 MB L3 Cache Intel® Itanium® 2 Processor 1.0 GHz with 3 MB L3 Cache)	S-Spec number	Clock speed	Cache		FSB speed	Cores (Threads)	Voltage	TDP (Note: Intel's originally defined TDP was equal to the maximum socket power, which is 130W) (W)	Release date	Price
Model	S-Spec number	Clock speed	L2	L3	FSB speed	Cores (Threads)	Voltage	TDP (W)	Release date	Price
Itanium 2 900 MHz 1.5 MB	SL67W	900 MHz	256 KB	1.5 MB	400 MT/s	1 (1)	1.5 V	90	2002-07-08	$1,338
Itanium 2 900 MHz 1.5 MB	SL6P6	900 MHz	256 KB	1.5 MB	400 MT/s	1 (1)	1.5 V	90	2002-07-08	$1,338
Itanium 2 1.0 GHz 1.5 MB	SL67U	1.0 GHz	256 KB	1.5 MB	400 MT/s	1 (1)	1.5 V	100	2002-07-08	$2,247
Itanium 2 1.0 GHz 1.5 MB	SL6P5	1.0 GHz	256 KB	1.5 MB	400 MT/s	1 (1)	1.5 V	100	2002-07-08	$2,247
Itanium 2 1.0 GHz 3 MB	SL67V	1.0 GHz	256 KB	3 MB	400 MT/s	1 (1)	1.5 V	100	2002-07-08	$4,226
Itanium 2 1.0 GHz 3 MB	SL6P7	1.0 GHz	256 KB	3 MB	400 MT/s	1 (1)	1.5 V	100	2002-07-08	$4,226

=== Madison (130 nm) ===
Stepping: B1. Die size: 374 mm^{2}. Transistor count: 410 million. CPUID: 001F010504h.
The Madison 9M table contains the 4MB and 6MB successors of the first Madisons.

Model (Note: The official full names: Intel® Itanium® 2 Processor 1.3 GHz with 3 MB L3 Cache Intel® Itanium® 2 Processor 1.4 GHz with 4 MB L3 Cache Intel® Itanium® 2 Processor 1.5 GHz with 6 MB L3 Cache Intel® Itanium® 2 Processor 1.4 GHz with 1.5 MB L3 Cache Intel® Itanium® 2 Processor 1.4 GHz with 3 MB L3 Cache Intel® Itanium® 2 Processor 1.6 GHz with 3 MB L3 Cache)	S-Spec number	Clock speed	Cache		FSB speed	SMP	Cores (Threads)	Voltage	TDP (Note: Maximum socket power is 130W) (W)	Release date	Price
Model	S-Spec number	Clock speed	L2	L3	FSB speed	SMP	Cores (Threads)	Voltage	TDP (W)	Release date	Price
Itanium 2 1.3 GHz 3 MB	SL6XD	1.3 GHz	256 KB	3 MB	400 MT/s	MP	1 (1)	1.3 V	97	2003-06-30	$1,338
Itanium 2 1.4 GHz 4 MB	SL6XE	1.4 GHz	256 KB	4 MB	400 MT/s	MP	1 (1)	1.3 V	91	2003-06-30	$2,247
Itanium 2 1.5 GHz 6 MB	SL6XF	1.5 GHz	256 KB	6 MB	400 MT/s	MP	1 (1)	1.3 V	107	2003-06-30	$4,226
Itanium 2 1.4 GHz 1.5 MB	SL76K	1.4 GHz	256 KB	1.5 MB	400 MT/s	DP	1 (1)	1.3 V	91	2003-09-08	$1,172
Itanium 2 1.4 GHz 3 MB	SL7FP	1.4 GHz	256 KB	3 MB	400 MT/s	DP	1 (1)	1.3 V	91	2004-04-13	$1,172
Itanium 2 1.6 GHz 3 MB (Note: Not to be confused with the Fanwood processor with near-identical specifications.)	SL7FQ	1.6 GHz	256 KB	3 MB	400 MT/s	DP	1 (1)	1.3 V	99	2004-04-13	$2,408

==== Deerfield ====
The same chip as Madison, but at a lower voltage.

Model (Note: The official full name: Low Voltage Intel® Itanium® 2 Processor 1.0 GHz with 1.5 MB L3 Cache)	S-Spec number	Clock speed	Cache		FSB speed	SMP	Cores (Threads)	Voltage	TDP (W)	Release date	Price
Model	S-Spec number	Clock speed	L2	L3	FSB speed	SMP	Cores (Threads)	Voltage	TDP (W)	Release date	Price
LV Itanium 2 1.0 GHz 1.5 MB	SL754	1.0 GHz	256 KB	1.5 MB	400 MT/s	DP	1 (1)	1.1 V	55 (Note: Maximum power is 62W)	2003-09-08	$744

=== Madison 9M (130 nm) ===
Steppings: A1 and A2. Die size: 432 mm^{2}. Transistor count: 592 million. CPUID: 001F020104h (stepping A1) or 001F020204h (stepping A2).
9M is the chip of all the third generation Itanium 2s, irrespective of the amount of enabled cache.

Model (Note: The official full names: Intel® Itanium® 2 Processor 1.5 GHz with 4 MB L3 Cache Intel® Itanium® 2 Processor 1.6 GHz with 6 MB L3 Cache Intel® Itanium® 2 Processor 1.6 GHz with 9 MB L3 Cache... Intel® Itanium® 2 Processor 1.66 GHz with 6 MB L3 Cache Intel® Itanium® 2 Processor 1.66 GHz with 9 MB L3 Cache)	S-Spec number	Clock speed	Cache		FSB speed	SMP	Voltage	TDP (W)	Release date	Price
Model	S-Spec number	Clock speed	L2	L3	FSB speed	SMP	Voltage	TDP (W)	Release date	Price
Itanium 2 1.5 GHz 4 MB	SL7ED, SL8CX	1500 MHz	256 KB	4 MB	400 MT/s	MP	1.3 V	107	2004-11-08	$910
Itanium 2 1.6 GHz 6 MB	SL7EB, SL8CV	1600 MHz	256 KB	6 MB	400 MT/s	MP	1.3 V	122	2004-11-08	$1,980
Itanium 2 1.6 GHz 9 MB	SL87H, SL8CU	1600 MHz	256 KB	9 MB	400 MT/s	MP	1.3 V	122	2004-11-08	$4,226
Itanium 2 1.6 GHz 6 MB	SL93X	1600 MHz	256 KB	6 MB	533 MT/s	MP	1.3 V	122	2006-2?	
Itanium 2 1.6 GHz 9 MB	SL93W	1600 MHz	256 KB	9 MB	533 MT/s	MP	1.3 V	122	2006-2?	
Itanium 2 1.66 GHz 6 MB	SL8JK	1666 MHz	256 KB	6 MB	667 MT/s	MP	1.3 V	122	2005-07-18	$2194
Itanium 2 1.66 GHz 9 MB	SL8JJ	1666 MHz	256 KB	9 MB	667 MT/s	MP	1.3 V	122	2005-07-18	$4,655

==== Fanwood ====
The same chip as Madison 9M, but restricted to 2-socket and uniprocessor systems.

Model (Note: The official full names: Low Voltage Intel® Itanium® 2 Processor 1.3 GHz with 3 MB L3 Cache Intel® Itanium® 2 Processor 1.6 GHz with 3 MB L3 Cache at 400 MHz System Bus (DP Optimized) Intel® Itanium® 2 Processor 1.0 GHz with 3 MB L3 Cache at 533 MHz System Bus (DP Optimized))	S-Spec number	Clock speed	Cache		FSB speed	SMP	Voltage	TDP (W)	Release date	Price
Model	S-Spec number	Clock speed	L2	L3	FSB speed	SMP	Voltage	TDP (W)	Release date	Price
LV Itanium 2 1.3 GHz 3 MB	SL7SD, SL8CY	1300 MHz	256 KB	3 MB	400 MT/s	DP		62	2004-11-08	$530
Itanium 2 1.6 GHz 3 MB (Note: Not to be confused with the Madison processor with near-identical specifications.)	SL7EC, SL8CW	1600 MHz	256 KB	3 MB	400 MT/s	DP	1.3 V	99	2004-11-08	$851
Itanium 2 1.6 GHz 3 MB	SL7EF, SL8CZ	1600 MHz	256 KB	3 MB	533 MT/s	DP	1.3 V	99	2004-11-08	$1,172

=== HP mx2 MCM (130 nm) ===
This multi-chip module codenamed Hondo is not an Intel product, but a separate project of Hewlett-Packard to pack two CPUs onto one PAC611 socket. The S-Spec SL75Z was assigned to the chips that Intel sent to HP for use in mx2.

Model	Clock speed	Cache			FSB speed	SMP	Cores	Voltage	TDP (W)	Release date
Model	Clock speed	L2	L3	L4	FSB speed	SMP	Cores	Voltage	TDP (W)	Release date
HP mx2	1100 MHz	2×256 KB	2×4 MB	32 MB	400 MT/s	MP	2	1.1 V	170	2004-06 (Note: Announced 2004-05-05, but available in June.)

=== Montecito (90 nm) ===
Steppings: C1 and C2. Die size: 596 mm^{2}. Transistor count: 1720 million. CPUID: 0020000504h (stepping C1) or 0020000704h (stepping C2).
All processors can support the legacy 400 MT/s FSB. From Montecito onwards all Itaniums are MP-capable.

Model number	Clock speed	Cache		FSB speed	Multiplier	Cores	Threads per core	Voltage	TDP (W)	Socket	Release date	Price (USD)
Model number	Clock speed	L2	L3	FSB speed	Multiplier	Cores	Threads per core	Voltage	TDP (W)	Socket	Release date	Price (USD)
Itanium 2 9010	1.6 GHz	256 KB D + 1 MB I	6 MB	533 MHz	12×	1	1	1.0875–1.25 V	75 W	PPGA611	2006-07-18	$696
Itanium 2 9015	1.4 GHz	256 KB D + 1 MB I	2×6 MB	400 MHz	14×	2	2	1.0875–1.25 V	104 W	PPGA611	2006-07-18	$749
Itanium 2 9020	1.42 GHz	256 KB D + 1 MB I	2×6 MB	533 MHz	10.5×	2	2	1.0875–1.25 V	104 W	PPGA611	2006-07-18	$910
Itanium 2 9030	1.6 GHz	256 KB D + 1 MB I	2×4 MB	533 MHz	12×	2	1	1.0875–1.25 V	104 W	PPGA611	2006-07-18	$1552
Itanium 2 9040	1.6 GHz	256 KB D + 1 MB I	2×9 MB	533 MHz	12×	2	2	1.0875–1.25 V	104 W	PPGA611	2006-07-18	$1980
Itanium 2 9050	1.6 GHz	256 KB D + 1 MB I	2×12 MB	533 MHz	12×	2	2	1.0875–1.25 V	104 W	PPGA611	2006-07-18	$3692

=== Montvale (90 nm) ===
The chip is similar to Montecito, but the stepping is A1 and the CPUID is 0020010104h. The models with 533 MT/s FSB also support 400 MT/s FSB operation. Itanium 9152, with the Core level Lock-Step error correction feature, was released only in 2008. Even though Intel does not use the "Itanium 2" branding for the 9100-series, it's still grouped with Itanium 2 processors because it uses the same platform and is a minor update on the 9000-series.

Model number	Clock speed	Cache		FSB speed	Multiplier	Cores	Threads per core	Voltage	TDP (W)	Socket	Release date	Price (USD)
Model number	Clock speed	L2	L3	FSB speed	Multiplier	Cores	Threads per core	Voltage	TDP (W)	Socket	Release date	Price (USD)
Itanium 9110N	1.6 GHz	256 KB D + 1 MB I	12 MB	533 MHz	12×	1	1	1.0875–1.25 V	75 W	PPGA611	2007-10-31	$696
Itanium 9120N	1.42 GHz	256 KB D + 1 MB I	2×6 MB	533 MHz	10.5×	2	2	1.0875–1.25 V	104 W	PPGA611	2007-10-31	$910
Itanium 9130M	1.66 GHz	256 KB D + 1 MB I	2×4 MB	667 MHz	10×	2	1	1.0875–1.25 V	104 W	PPGA611	2007-10-31	$1552
Itanium 9140N	1.6 GHz	256 KB D + 1 MB I	2×9 MB	533 MHz	12×	2	2	1.0875–1.25 V	104 W	PPGA611	2007-10-31	$1980
Itanium 9140M	1.66 GHz	256 KB D + 1 MB I	2×9 MB	667 MHz	10×	2	2	1.0875–1.25 V	104 W	PPGA611	2007-10-31	$1980
Itanium 9150N	1.6 GHz	256 KB D + 1 MB I	2×12 MB	533 MHz	12×	2	2	1.0875–1.25 V	104 W	PPGA611	2007-10-31	$3692
Itanium 9150M	1.66 GHz	256 KB D + 1 MB I	2×12 MB	667 MHz	10×	2	2	1.0875–1.25 V	104 W	PPGA611	2007-10-31	$3692
Itanium 9152	1.66 GHz	256 KB D + 1 MB I	2×12 MB	667 MHz	10×	2	2	1.0875–1.25 V	104 W	PPGA611	2008	

== Itanium (2007–2019) ==
These later generations of Itanium use socket LGA 1248, the QuickPath Interconnect and Scalable Memory Interconnect having replaced the Front-Side Bus used by Itanium 2.

=== Tukwila (65 nm) ===
Stepping: E0. Die size: 699 mm^{2}. Transistor count: 2046 million. CPUID: 0020020404.
All models support: XD bit (an NX bit implementation), Hyper-threading, Turbo Boost, VT-i2 (Itanium Virtualization technology), Intel VT-d, RAS with Advanced Machine Check Architecture, Cache Safe technology, Enhanced Demand Based Switching, ECC, two memory controllers each with two SMI links to memory buffers for DDR3, for a combined memory bandwidth of 34 GB/s and capacity of 256 GB. The QPI bandwidth is 96 GB/s for cache coherency and 24 GB/s for I/O.

Model number	Clock speed		Cache		QuickPath	Cores	Threads per core	Voltage	TDP (W)	Socket	Release date	Price (USD)
Model number	Clock speed	Turbo Boost	L2	L3	QuickPath	Cores	Threads per core	Voltage	TDP (W)	Socket	Release date	Price (USD)
Itanium 9310	1.60 GHz	—N/a	256 KiB D + 512 KiB I	2×5 MiB	4.8 GT/s	2	2	0.8–1.35 V	130W	LGA1248	2010-02-08	$946
Itanium 9320	1.33 GHz	1.46 GHz	256 KiB D + 512 KiB I	4×4 MiB	4.8 GT/s	4	2	0.8–1.35 V	155W	LGA1248	2010-02-08	$1614
Itanium 9330	1.46 GHz	1.60 GHz	256 KiB D + 512 KiB I	4×5 MiB	4.8 GT/s	4	2	0.8–1.35 V	155W	LGA1248	2010-02-08	$2059
Itanium 9340	1.60 GHz	1.73 GHz	256 KiB D + 512 KiB I	4×5 MiB	4.8 GT/s	4	2	0.8–1.35 V	185W	LGA1248	2010-02-08	$2059
Itanium 9350	1.73 GHz	1.86 GHz	256 KiB D + 512 KiB I	4×6 MiB	4.8 GT/s	4	2	0.8–1.35 V	185W	LGA1248	2010-02-08	$3838

=== Poulson (32 nm) ===
Stepping: D0. Die size: 544 mm^{2}. Transistor count: 3.1 billion. CPUID: 0021000404.
All models support: Itanium New Instructions, XD bit (an NX bit implementation), Intel VT-x, Intel VT-d, VT-i3 (Itanium Virtualization technology), Hyper-threading (with Dual-Domain Multithreading), Turbo Boost, Enhanced Intel SpeedStep Technology (EIST), Cache-Safe technology, RAS with Advanced Machine Check Architecture, Instruction Replay technology, ECC, two memory controllers each with two SMI links to memory buffers for DDR3, for a combined memory bandwidth of 45 GB/s and capacity of 512 GB. The QPI bandwidth is 128 GB/s for cache coherency and 32 GB/s for I/O.

Model number	Clock speed		Cache		QuickPath	Cores	Threads per core	Voltage	TDP (W)	Socket	Release date	Price (USD)
Model number	Clock Speed	Turbo-boost	L2	L3	QuickPath	Cores	Threads per core	Voltage	TDP (W)	Socket	Release date	Price (USD)
Itanium 9520	1.73 GHz		256 KiB D + 512 KiB I	20 MiB	6.4 GT/s	4	2	0.85-1.2 V	130W	LGA1248	2012-11-08	$1350
Itanium 9540	2.13 GHz		256 KiB D + 512 KiB I	24 MiB	6.4 GT/s	8	2	0.85-1.2 V	170W	LGA1248	2012-11-08	$2650
Itanium 9550	2.4 GHz		256 KiB D + 512 KiB I	32 MiB	6.4 GT/s	4	2	0.85-1.2 V	170W	LGA1248	2012-11-08	$3750
Itanium 9560	2.53 GHz		256 KiB D + 512 KiB I	32 MiB	6.4 GT/s	8	2	0.85-1.2 V	170W	LGA1248	2012-11-08	$4650

=== Kittson (32 nm) ===
The 9700 series, despite nominally having a different stepping (E0 with CPUID 0021000504), is functionally identical with the 9500 series, even having exactly the same bugs, the only difference being the 133 MHz higher frequency of 9760 and 9750 over 9560 and 9550 respectively. Intel had committed to at least one more generation after Poulson, first mentioning Kittson on 14 June 2007. Kittson was supposed to be on a 22 nm process and use the same LGA2011 socket and platform as Xeons. On 31 January 2013 Intel issued an update to their plans for Kittson: it would have the same LGA1248 socket and 32 nm process as Poulson, effectively halting any further development of Itanium processors.

Model number	Clock speed		Cache		QuickPath	Cores	Threads per core	Voltage	TDP (W)	Socket	Release date	Price (USD)
Model number	Clock Speed	Turbo-boost	L2	L3	QuickPath	Cores	Threads per core	Voltage	TDP (W)	Socket	Release date	Price (USD)
Itanium 9720	1.73 GHz		256 KiB D + 512 KiB I	20 MiB	6.4 GT/s	4	2	0.85-1.2 V	130W	LGA1248	2017-05-11	$1350
Itanium 9740	2.13 GHz		256 KiB D + 512 KiB I	24 MiB	6.4 GT/s	8	2	0.85-1.2 V	170W	LGA1248	2017-05-11	$2650
Itanium 9750	2.53 GHz		256 KiB D + 512 KiB I	32 MiB	6.4 GT/s	4	2	0.85-1.2 V	170W	LGA1248	2017-05-11	$3750
Itanium 9760	2.66 GHz		256 KiB D + 512 KiB I	32 MiB	6.4 GT/s	8	2	0.85-1.2 V	170W	LGA1248	2017-05-11	$4650

== See also ==
- Itanium
- List of Intel microprocessors
