= Tukwila =

Tukwila may refer to:

- Tukwila, Washington, a town in Washington, United States
- Tukwila (Amtrak station), a Sounder train station serving the city of Tukwila, Washington
- Tukwila (processor), an Intel Itanium 2 processor released in February 2010
