= Tukwila (processor) =

The Itanium 9300 series, code-named Tukwila, is the generation of Intel's Itanium processor family following Itanium 2 and Montecito. It was released on 8 February 2010. It utilizes both multiple processor cores (multi-core) and SMT techniques. The engineers said to be working on this project were from the DEC Alpha project, specifically those who worked on the Alpha 21464 (EV8), which was focused on SMT.

Named for the city of Tukwila, Washington, Tukwila was previously code-named Tanglewood. The original name is also used by the Tanglewood music festival, and Intel renamed the project in late 2003.

The processor has two to four cores per die and up to 24 MB L3 of on-die cache. They are the first batch of processors to contain more than 2 billion transistors on a single die. This total is made up as follows:

- core logic — 430 million
- system interface — 157 million
- L3 cache — 1,420 million
- I/O logic — 39 million
- chip total — 2.046 billion

Die size is 21.5×32.5 mm or 698.75 mm^{2}.

== Xeon compatibility ==
It was originally stated that Tukwila and its associated chipset would bring socket compatibility between Intel's Xeon and Itanium processors, by introducing a new interconnect called Intel QuickPath Interconnect (QuickPath, previously known as Common System Interface or CSI). This ultimate endeavor would help reduce product development costs for both Intel and its partners, by allowing for greater reuse of components and manufacturing processes. Tukwila is reported to have four "full" QuickPath links and two "half" links.

Whitefield, the first Xeon processor to feature QuickPath, suffered significant project delays and was cancelled. The first Xeon MP processor to feature QuickPath is Beckton.

The released Itanium 9300-series processors are using a separate socket, LGA 1248, which is incompatible with Xeon processors and motherboards.

== Comparison table ==
Model	Cores	Threads	Core Clock (GHz)	Core Clock with Intel Turbo Boost (GHz)	L3 Cache (MiB)	QPI speed (GT/s)	TDP (watts)	February 2010 Price	Comments
9310	2	4	1.6	N/A	10	4.8	130	$946	Low power consumption
9320	4	8	1.33	1.46	16	4.8	155	$1,614	Value
9330	4	8	1.46	1.6	20	4.8	155	$2,059	Performance per watt
9340	4	8	1.6	1.73	20	4.8	185	$2,059	Price performance
9350	4	8	1.73	1.86	24	4.8	185	$3,838	Performance

== Successor ==
The successor is code-named Poulson. It was initially slated for a Q4 2009 release and said to have over four cores, most likely eight.

In 2009, an Intel representative stated that Intel would maintain a two-year development cycle for Itanium, implying Poulson would be released in Q1 2012.
