= Bisection bandwidth =

Measure of a network's bandwidth

In computer networking, a network may be bisected into two equal-sized partitions. The bisection bandwidth of a network topology is the minimum bandwidth available between any two such partitions. Given a graph $G$ with vertices $V$, edges $E$, and edge weights $w$, the bisection bandwidth of $G$ is

$BB(G) = \min_{S\subset V : |S|=\frac{1}{2}|V|} \quad \sum_{u\in S, v\not\in S} w(u,v)$.

In other words, the network is bisected s in such a way that the bandwidth between the two partitions is minimum. A network is considered to have full bisection bandwidth if $BB(G)\geq \frac{1}{2}|V|$. Intuitively, full bisection bandwidth means that if all vertices in the network are matched as source-destination pairs, then if all pairs send flow at rate 1 simultaneously, there are no bisection bottlenecks. Therefore, bisection bandwidth accounts for the bottleneck bandwidth of the bisected network as a whole.

== Bisection bandwidth calculations ==
For a linear array with n nodes bisection bandwidth is one link bandwidth. For linear array only one link needs to be broken to bisect the network into two partitions.

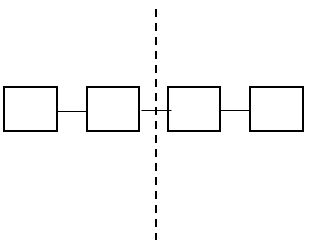
Bisection of linear array network

For ring topology with n nodes two links should be broken to bisect the network, so bisection bandwidth becomes bandwidth of two links.

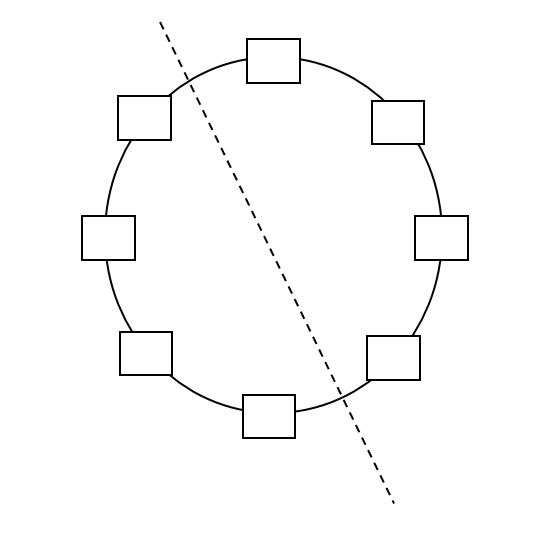
Bisection of a ring network

For tree topology with n nodes can be bisected at the root by breaking one link, so bisection bandwidth is one link bandwidth.

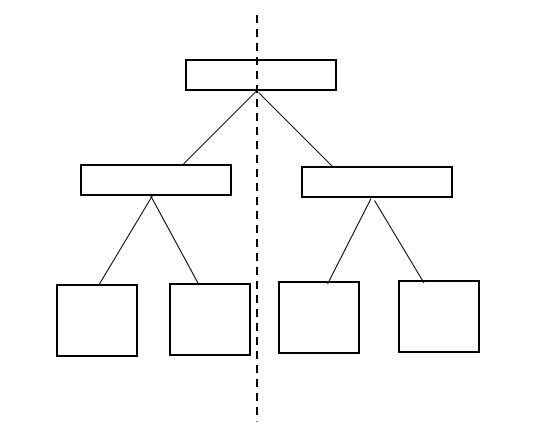
Bisection of a tree network

For Mesh topology with n nodes, $\sqrt{n}$ links should be broken to bisect the network, so bisection bandwidth is bandwidth of $\sqrt{n}$ links.

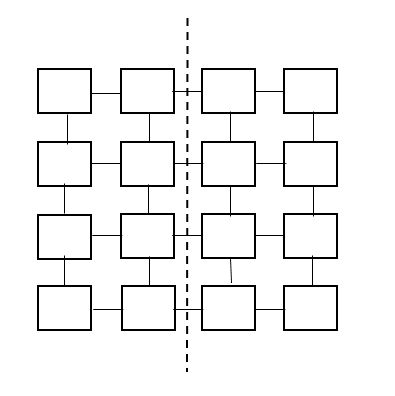
Bisection of a 2d mesh network

For Hyper-cube topology with n nodes, n/2 links should be broken to bisect the network, so bisection bandwidth is bandwidth of n/2 links.

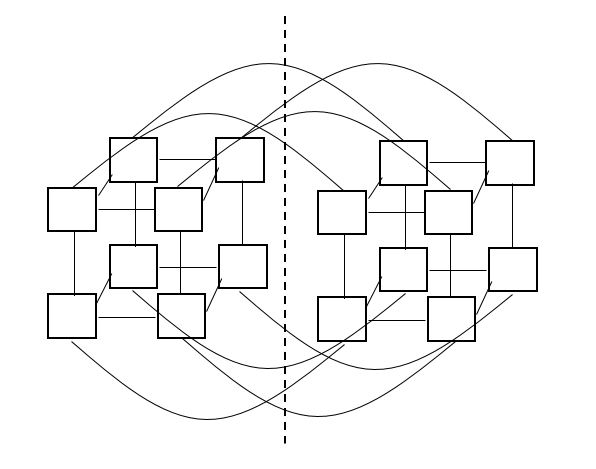
Bisection of hyper-cube network

== Significance of bisection bandwidth ==
Theoretical support for the importance of this measure of network performance was developed in the PhD research of Clark Thomborson (formerly Clark Thompson). Thomborson proved that important algorithms for sorting, Fast Fourier transformation, and matrix-matrix multiplication become communication-limited—as opposed to CPU-limited or memory-limited—on computers with insufficient bisection bandwidth. F. Thomson Leighton's PhD research tightened Thomborson's loose bound on the bisection bandwidth of a computationally-important variant of the De Bruijn graph known as the shuffle-exchange network. Based on Bill Dally's analysis of latency, average-case throughput, and hot-spot throughput of m-ary n-cube networks for various m, it can be observed that low-dimensional networks, in comparison to high-dimensional networks (e.g., binary n-cubes) with the same bisection bandwidth (e.g., tori), have reduced latency and higher hot-spot throughput.

Note, there is also support that bisection bandwidth and network throughput are asymptotically different metrics, which may grow at different rates depending on the network topology.
