= LGA 1248 =

CPU socket used for later Intel Itanium processors

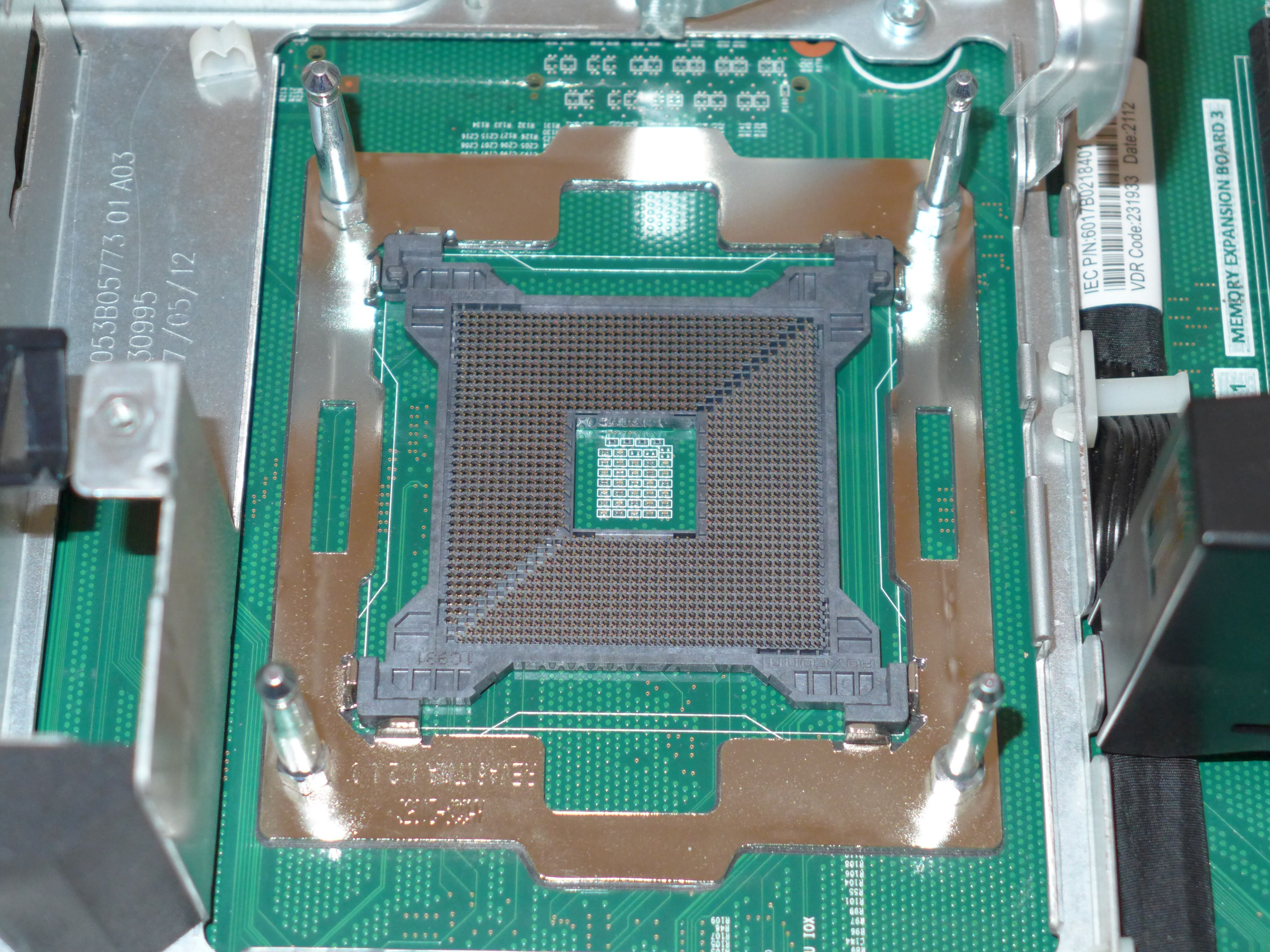
- Type: LGA
- Chip form factors: FC-LGA
- Contacts: 1248
- Voltage range: 0.8V - 1.35V
- Processors: Intel Itanium 9300 series Intel Itanium 9500 series Intel Itanium 9700 series
- Predecessor: PAC611
- This article is part of the CPU socket series

LGA 1248 is an Intel CPU Socket for Itanium processors from the 9300-series to the 9700-series. It replaces PAC611 (also known as PPGA661) used by Itanium 9100-series processors and adds Intel QuickPath Interconnect functionalities.

== See also ==
- List of Intel microprocessors
- List of Intel Itanium microprocessors
- CPU socket
