= Rajiv Gupta (technocrat) =

General Manager at Hewlett Packard

Rajeev Gupta
- Born: 1963
- Occupation: Entrepreneur
- Spouse: Debra Gupta

Rajiv Gupta is an engineer, a repeat entrepreneur and currently an executive at McAfee.

== Early life ==
Gupta earned a bachelor's degree from the Indian Institute of Technology Kharagpur around 1984. He received his Ph.D. in compiler optimization from the California Institute of Technology (Caltech) in 1990. He married a British woman, Debra and they have two children - Veda and Anya. He resides in Los Altos.

== Career ==
Gupta joined Hewlett-Packard in 1990, and developed the IA-64 architecture, which HP called WideWord and Intel marketed as Itanium. From 1995 he developed a client utility project at HP Labs, which was an early example of a service-oriented architecture for Web services. He was co-creator and general manager of the E-speak project when it was announced in 1999. Around the same time, he supported his brother Sanjiv Gupta, to start Bodhtree Consulting, Ltd., in Hyderabad, India. The E-speak technology was abandoned in late 2001. In 2002, Gupta founded Confluent Software, developing what became the CoreSV product. It was acquired by Oblix in February 2004, which in turn was acquired by Oracle Corporation in March, 2005. In 2005 he founded Securent, which was acquired by Cisco in November 2007 for an estimated $100 million. He has more than 45 patents.

In 2011 Gupta founded Skyhigh Networks. The first round of financing was led by Greylock Partners in April, 2012, for about $6.5 million. The company raised $20 million in May, 2013, led by Sequoia Capital. Another investment of $40 million was announced in June, 2014, from existing investors and Salesforce.com.

On November 28, 2017, McAfee announced it would acquire Skyhigh Networks and appoint Rajiv Gupta as the head of McAfee's entire cloud business.
