= PAC418 =

Microprocessor socket

Socket PAC418
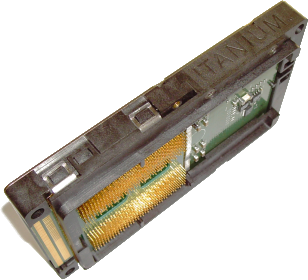
- Type: PGA
- Chip form factors: VLIF-PGA
- Contacts: 418
- FSB protocol: P7
- Voltage range: 1.1-1.85V
- Processors: Intel Itanium
- Successor: PAC611
- This article is part of the CPU socket series

Socket PAC418 is a 418 pin microprocessor socket designed to interface an Intel Itanium processor to the rest of the computer (usually via the motherboard). It provides both an electrical interface as well as physical support. This socket is designed to support a microprocessor module.

== Technical specifications ==
Socket PAC418 was introduced with Intel's first generation Itanium in 2001. It supported bus speeds up to 133 MHz double-pumped.

Socket PAC418 processors reach speeds of 800 MHz.

== See also ==
- List of Intel microprocessors
