= PAC611 =

Socket PAC611
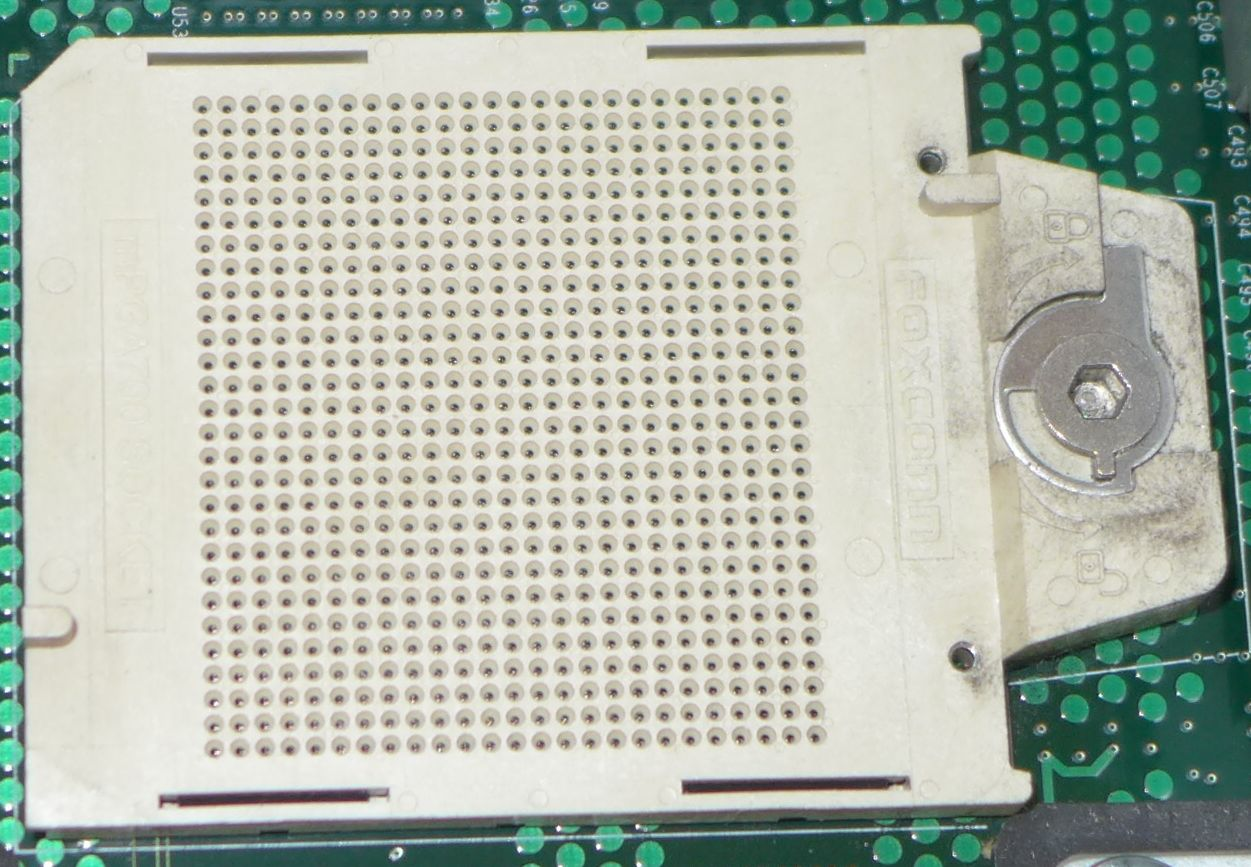
- Type: PGA
- Chip form factors: VLIF-PGA
- Contacts: 611
- FSB protocol: P7
- Voltage range: 1.5V
- Processors: Intel Itanium 2
- Predecessor: PAC418
- Successor: LGA 1248
- This article is part of the CPU socket series

Socket PAC611 is a 611 pin microprocessor socket designed to interface an Intel Itanium 2 processor to the rest of the computer (usually via the motherboard). It provides both an electrical interface as well as physical support. This socket is designed to support a microprocessor module.

== Technical specifications ==
Socket PAC611 was introduced with Intel's second generation Itanium in 2002. It supported bus speeds up to 200 MHz double-pumped.

Socket PAC611 processors reach speeds up to 1.66 GHz.

== See also ==
- List of Intel microprocessors
