= LongRun =

LongRun and LongRun2 are power management technologies introduced by Transmeta. LongRun was introduced with the Crusoe processor, while LongRun2 was introduced with the Efficeon processor. LongRun2 has since been licensed to Fujitsu, NEC, Sony, Toshiba, and NVIDIA.

LongRun automatically adjusted the processor, moving between higher performance but higher power, and lower power but lower performance. The goals of the automation could be adjusted. One control offered processor frequency levels, and the ability to set a minimum and maximum "window", where the automatic controls would not adjust the speed outside of the window. A second control offered a target of either "economy" or "performance". Some versions offered a third control that adjusted the processor based on power rather than speed.

LongRun was based primarily on reducing the clock frequency and voltage supplied to the processor, now commonly called DVFS. Lower frequency reduces performance but also allows voltage reduction, and can yield both power savings and improved efficiency. LongRun2 built further on this by incorporating process technology aimed at reducing variations in the manufacturing process and thereby improving yields.
