= Transmeta =

American semiconductor design company

Transmeta Corporation
- Type: Private
- Industry: Intellectual property licensing
- Founded: 1995; 31 years ago
- Defunct: 2009; 17 years ago
- Fate: Acquired by Novafora, patent portfolio sold to Intellectual Ventures.
- Headquarters: Santa Clara, California
- Key people: Murray A. Goldman, David Ditzel, Colin Hunter
- Products: Microprocessors, microprocessor patents
- Revenue: ▲$2.48 million (2007)
- Operating income: ▼ -$61.121 million (2007)
- Net income: ▼ -$66.812 million (2007)
- Number of employees: 24 (2009)
- Parent: Novafora
- Website: transmeta.com at the Wayback Machine (archived 2000-02-29)

Transmeta Corporation was an American fabless semiconductor company based in Santa Clara, California. It developed low-power x86-compatible microprocessors based on a VLIW core and a software layer called Code Morphing Software.

Code Morphing Software (CMS) consisted of an interpreter, a runtime system, and a dynamic binary translator. x86 instructions were first interpreted one instruction at a time and profiled, and then, based on the frequency of execution of a code block, CMS would progressively generate more optimized translations.

The VLIW core implemented features specifically designed to accelerate CMS and translations. Among the features were support for general speculation, detection of memory aliasing, and detection of self-modifying x86 code.

The combination of CMS and the VLIW core achieved of full x86 compatibility while maintaining performance and reducing power consumption.

Transmeta was founded in 1995 by Bob Cmelik, Dave Ditzel, Colin Hunter, Ed Kelly, Doug Laird, Malcolm Wing, and Greg Zyner.

Its first product, the Crusoe processor, was launched on January 19, 2000. Transmeta went public on November 7, 2000. On October 14, 2003, it launched its second major product, the Efficeon processor. In 2005, Transmeta increased its focus on licensing its portfolio of microprocessor and semiconductor technologies. After layoffs in 2007, Transmeta made a complete shift away from semiconductor production to IP licensing. In January 2009, the company was acquired by Novafora and the patent portfolio was sold to Intellectual Ventures. Novafora ceased operations in August 2009. Intellectual Ventures licenses the Transmeta IP to other companies on a non-exclusive basis.

Transmeta produced two x86-compatible CPU architectures: Crusoe and Efficeon. (Internal code names were "Fred" and "Astro".) These CPUs have appeared in subnotebooks, notebooks, desktops, blade servers, tablet PCs, a personal cluster computer, and a silent desktop, where low power consumption and heat dissipation are of primary importance.

Before the 2009 acquisition by Novafora, Transmeta had moderate success licensing its IP. Licensors for Transmeta technology are Intel (with a perpetual, non-exclusive license to all Transmeta patents and patent applications, including any that Transmeta might acquire before December 31, 2017), Nvidia (with non-exclusive license to Transmeta's LongRun and LongRun2 technologies and other intellectual property), Sony (LongRun2 licensee), Fujitsu (LongRun2 licensee) and NEC (LongRun2 licensee).

== History ==
=== Stealth start-up ===
Founded in 1995, Transmeta began as a stealth startup. The company was largely successful in hiding its ambitions until its official company launch on January 19, 2000. Over 2000 non-disclosure agreements (NDAs) were signed during the stealth period. Throughout Transmeta's first few years, little was known about exactly what it would be offering. Its web site went online in mid 1997 and for approximately two and a half years displayed nothing but the text, "This web page is not yet here."

On November 12, 1999, a cryptic comment in the HTML appeared:

Yes, there is a secret message, and this is it: Transmeta's policy has been to remain silent about its plans until it had something to demonstrate to the world. On January 19, 2000, Transmeta is going to announce and demonstrate what Crusoe processors can do. Simultaneously, all of the details will go up on this Web site for everyone on the Internet to see. Crusoe will be cool hardware and software for mobile applications. Crusoe will be unconventional, which is why we wanted to let you know in advance to come look at the entire Web site in January, so that you can get the full story and have access to all of the real details as soon as they are available.

Transmeta attempted to staff the company in secret although speculation online was not uncommon. Information gradually came out of the company suggesting it was working on a very long instruction word (VLIW) design that translated x86 code into its own native VLIW code.

=== Public launch ===
On January 19, 2000, Transmeta held a launch event at Villa Montalvo in Saratoga, California and announced to the world that it had been working on an x86-compatible dynamic binary translation processor named Crusoe. It also released an 18-page whitepaper describing the technology.

Transmeta marketed their microprocessor technology as extraordinarily innovative and revolutionary in the low-power market segment. They had hoped to be both power and performance leaders in the x86 space but initial reviews of Crusoe indicated the performance fell significantly short of projections. Also, while Crusoe was in development, Intel and AMD significantly ramped up speeds and began to address concerns about power consumption. So Crusoe was rapidly cornered into a low-volume, small form factor (SFF), low-power segment of the market.

On November 7, 2000 (US election day), Transmeta had their initial public offering at the price of $21 a share. The value reached a high of $50.26 before settling down to $46 a share on opening day. This made Transmeta the last of the great high tech IPOs of the dot-com bubble. Their opening day performance would not be surpassed until Google’s IPO in 2004.

The company had its first layoffs in July 2002, reducing the headcount of the company by 40%.

On October 14, 2003, Transmeta announced the Efficeon processor which was claimed to have twice the performance of the original Crusoe CPU at the same frequency. However, performance was still weak relative to the competition and the complexity of the chip had increased significantly. The greater size and power consumption may have diluted a key market advantage Transmeta's chips had previously enjoyed over the competition.

In January 2005, the company announced its first strategic restructuring away from being a semiconductor product company and began to focus on licensing intellectual property. In March 2005, Transmeta announced that it was laying off 68 people while retaining 208 employees. Sony was reported to be a key licensee of Transmeta technology, and approximately half of the remaining employees were to work on LongRun2 power optimization technology for Sony.

On May 31, 2005, Transmeta announced the signing of asset purchase and license agreements with Hong Kong’s Culture.com Technology Limited. The deal fell apart due to delays in obtaining technology export licenses from the US Department of Commerce and the parties announced the termination of the agreements on February 9, 2006.

On August 10, 2005, Transmeta announced its first-ever profitable quarter. This was followed by GameSpot’s March 20, 2006 report that Transmeta was working on an "unnamed" Microsoft project. As it turned out, this was a secure platform under the AMD brand for Microsoft FlexGo.

On October 11, 2006, Transmeta announced that they had filed a lawsuit against Intel Corporation for infringement of ten Transmeta U.S. patents covering computer architecture and power efficiency technologies. The complaint charged that Intel had infringed and was infringing Transmeta's patents by making and selling a variety of microprocessor products, including at least Intel's Pentium III, Pentium 4, Pentium M, Core, and Core 2 product line.

On February 7, 2007, Transmeta shut down its engineering services division, terminating 75 employees in the process. This was concurrent with an announcement that the company would no longer develop and sell hardware and would focus on the development and licensing of intellectual property. Subsequently, AMD invested $7.5 million in Transmeta, planning to use the company's patent portfolio in energy-efficient technologies.

On October 24, 2007, Transmeta announced an agreement to settle its lawsuit against Intel Corporation. Intel agreed to pay $150 million upfront and $20 million per year for five years to Transmeta and drop its counterclaims against Transmeta. Transmeta also agreed to license several of its patents and assign a small portfolio of patents to Intel as part of the deal. Transmeta also agreed to never manufacture x86-compatible processors again. One significant sore point in the Intel litigation was the payout of approximately $34M to three of Transmeta's executives. In late 2008, Intel and Transmeta reached a further agreement to transfer the $20 million per year in one lump sum.

On August 8, 2008, Transmeta announced that it had licensed its LongRun and low-power chip technologies to Nvidia for a one-time license fee of $25 million. On November 17, Transmeta announced the signing of a definitive agreement to be acquired by Novafora, a digital video processor company based in Santa Clara, California, for $255.6 million in cash, subject to adjustments dependent on working capital. The deal was finalized on January 28, 2009, when Novafora announced the completion of its acquisition of Transmeta.

Intellectual Venture Funding LLC completed the acquisition of the patent portfolio formerly developed and owned by Transmeta Corporation on February 4, 2009.

Due to financial troubles and inability to execute, Novafora collapsed in late July, 2009.

== Management and staff ==
=== Corporate governance ===
Transmeta had a succession of 6 different chief executive officers who ran the company over its lifetime.

CEO	Years of service
David Ditzel	1995–2001
Mark Allen	2001–2001
Murray Goldman w/ Hugh Barnes as COO	2001–2002
Matt R. Perry	2002–2005
Art Swift	2005–2007
Lester Crudele	2007–2009

=== Notable employees ===
Among its crew of technologists, Transmeta employed some of the industry's more public figures including Linux founder Linus Torvalds, Linux kernel developer H. Peter Anvin, Yacc author Stephen C. Johnson, and game developer Dave D. Taylor. Partially because of the presence of these figures, the industry was constantly abuzz with rumors and "conspiracy theories", resulting in excellent press relations.

== Financial history ==
The following charts show the company's revenues, operating expenses, gross profits, and net losses from 1996 through 2007. Numbers are in 1000s as per the 10-K reports. The company was once named as the Most important company in Silicon Valley in an Upside magazine editorial, but failed to obtain profitability while it was a chip vendor.

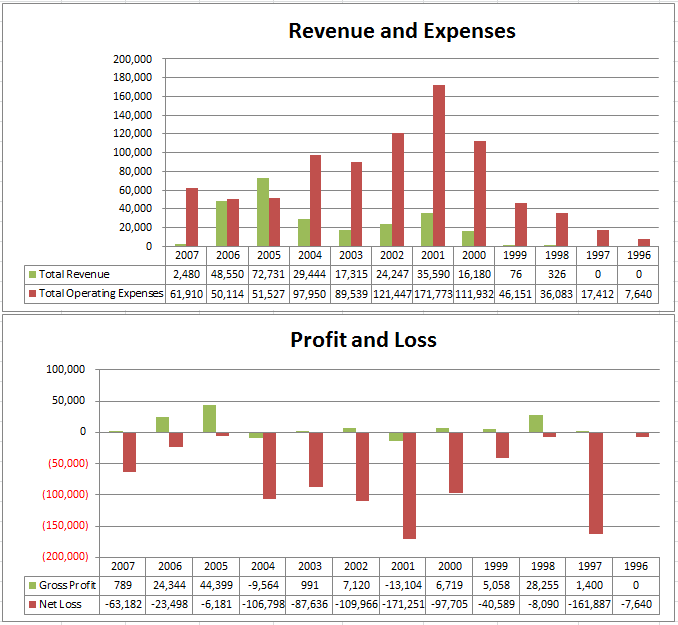
Revenues, expenses, gross profits, and losses from 1996 to 2007

=== Funding ===
Transmeta received a total of $969M in funding during its lifetime.

Year	Quarter	Amount ($ million)	Notes
1996	–	288	–
2000	Q2	88	–
2000	Q4	273	IPO
2003	Q4	83	Secondary offering
2007	Q2	7.5	AMD
2007	Q4	150	Intel settlement
2008	Q3	80	Intel settlement

== Products ==
=== Crusoe ===
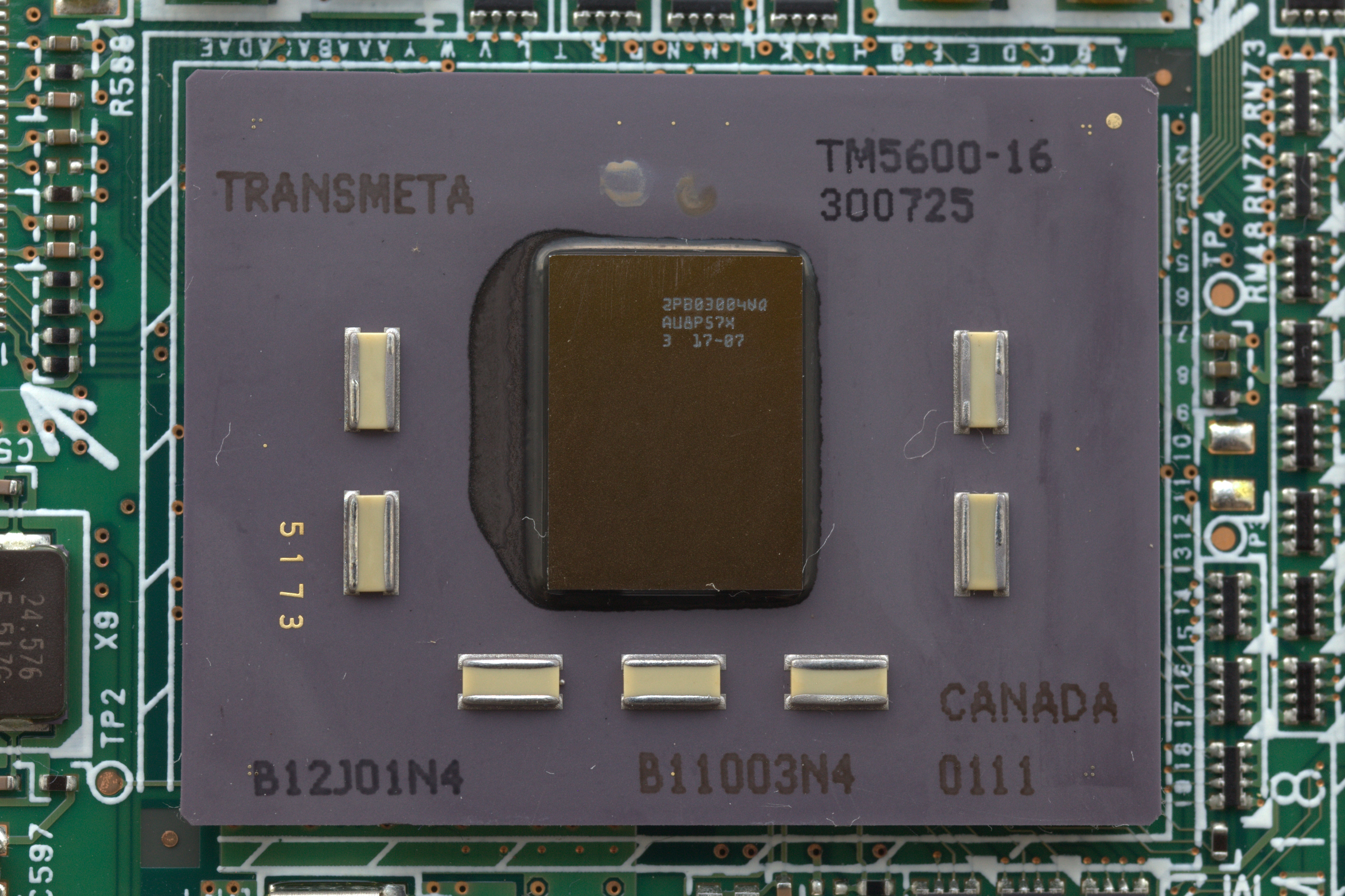
A Transmeta CPU from a Fujitsu Lifebook P series laptop

Crusoe was the first family of microprocessors from Transmeta, named after the literary character Robinson Crusoe.

Transmeta lost much credibility and endured significant criticism due to the large discrepancies between projected performance and power consumption and the actual results. Although power consumption was somewhat better than Intel and AMD offerings, the end-user experience (i.e., battery life) showed only marginal improvement. First, the Code Morphing Software (CMS) combined with cache architecture artificially inflated comparisons between benchmarks and real-world applications. This is due to the repetitive nature of benchmarks and their small footprints. The CMS software overhead may have actually been a key cause of much-lower performance for many real-world applications; the simple VLIW core architecture could not compete on computationally intensive applications; and the southbridge interface was limited by its low bandwidth for graphics or other I/O-intensive applications. Some standard benchmarks even failed to run, throwing the claim of full x86 compatibility into doubt.

=== Efficeon ===
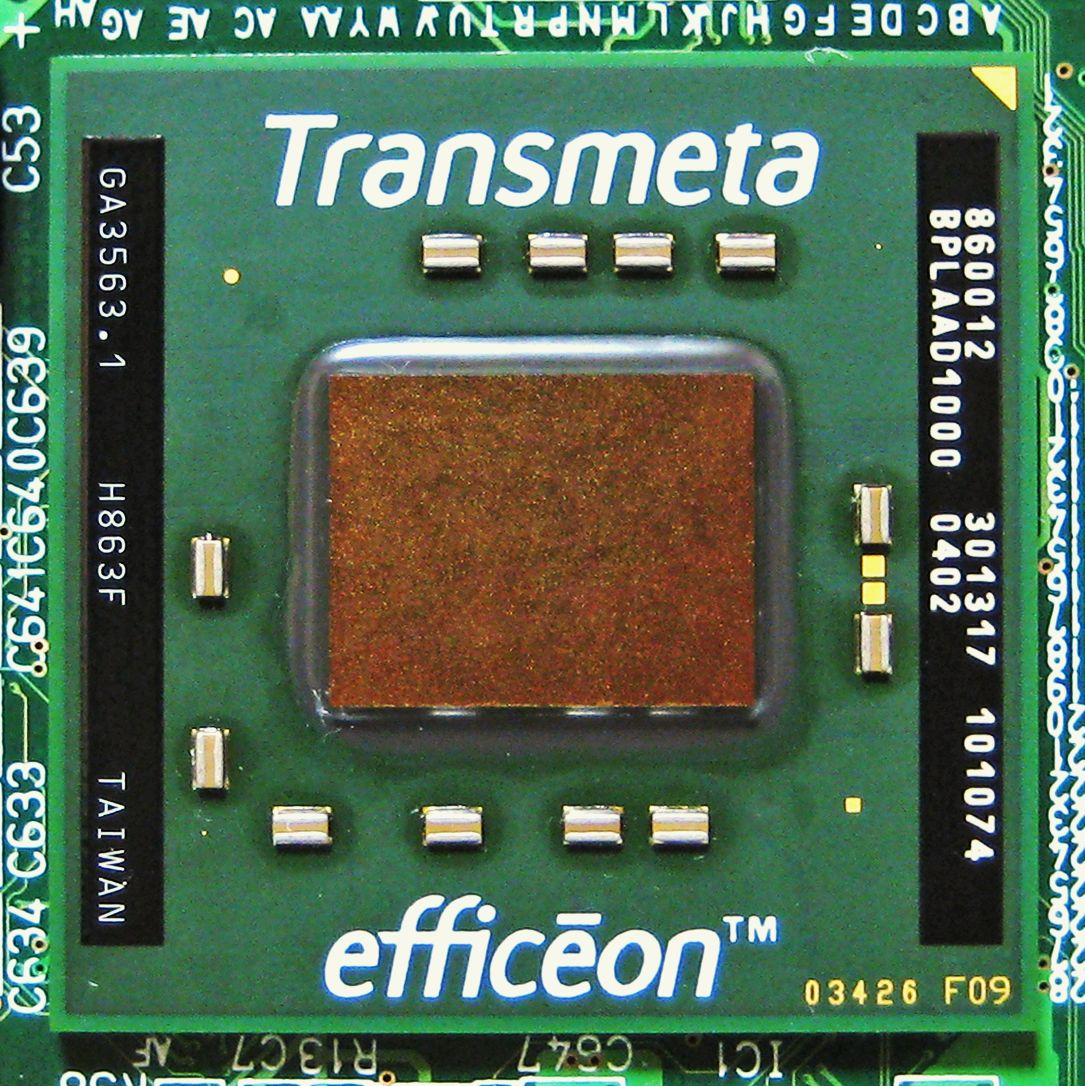
A Transmeta Efficeon processor

The Efficeon processor was Transmeta's second-generation 256-bit VLIW processor design. Like the Crusoe (a 128-bit VLIW architecture), Efficeon stressed computational efficiency, low power consumption, and a small thermal footprint.

A 2004-model 1.6-GHz Transmeta Efficeon (manufactured using a 90 nm process) had roughly the same performance and power characteristics as a 1.6-GHz Intel Atom from 2008 (manufactured using a 45 nm process). The Efficeon included an integrated northbridge, while the competing Atom required an external northbridge chip, reducing much of the Atom's power consumption benefits.

The Transmeta Efficeon processor addressed many of Crusoe's shortcomings and showed roughly a 2x real-world improvement over Crusoe. Its die was considerably smaller than Pentium 4 and Pentium M, when compared in the same process technology. Efficeon's die fabricated in 90 nm is 68 mm^{2}, which is 60% of the Pentium 4 in 90 nm, at 112 mm^{2}, with both processors possessing a 1 MB L2 cache.

The notion of selling a product into a specific thermal envelope was typically not understood by most reviewers, who tended to compare Efficeon to the gamut of x86 microprocessors, regardless of power consumption or application. One such example of this criticism suggested that the performance still significantly lagged behind Intel's Pentium M (Banias) and AMD's Mobile Athlon XP.

== Technology ==
Transmeta processors were in-order very long instruction word (VLIW) cores running a special dynamic binary translation software layer which together implemented compatibility with the x86 architecture. Transmeta trademarked the term "Code Morphing" to describe their technology and referred to the software layer as Code Morphing Software (CMS).

Transmeta used reverse body bias to reduce power consumption by a factor of about 2.5. (A similar technology was used in XScale processors.)

=== Code Morphing Software ===
Code Morphing Software (CMS) is the technology used by Transmeta microprocessors to execute x86 instructions. In a broad view, CMS reads x86 instructions and generates instructions for a proprietary VLIW processor, in the style of Shade (the fast instruction set simulator and custom trace generator originally developed by Bob Cmelik (Sun Microsystems) and David Keppel (University of Washington)). CMS translation is much more expensive than Shade's, but it produces much higher quality code. CMS also contains an interpreter and simulates both user-mode and system-mode operation.

Code Morphing Software consisted of an interpreter, a runtime system, and a dynamic binary translator. x86 instructions were first interpreted one instruction at a time and profiled, and then, based on the frequency of execution and other heuristics, CMS would progressively generate more optimized translations.

Similar technologies existed in the 1990s: Wabi for Solaris and Linux, FX!32 for Alpha, IA-32 EL for Itanium, open-source DAISY (Dynamically Architected Instruction Set from Yorktown) and its successor BOA (Binary-translation and Optimization Architecture) from IBM Research, and the Mac 68k emulator for the PowerPC. The Transmeta approach set a much higher bar for x86 compatibility due to its ability to execute all x86 instructions from initial boot up to the latest multimedia instructions.

The operation of Transmeta's code morphing software is similar to the final optimization pass of a conventional compiler. Considering a fragment of 32-bit x86 code:

add eax,dword ptr [esp] // load data from stack, add to eax
add ebx,dword ptr [esp] // ditto, for ebx
mov esi,[ebp]           // load esi from memory
sub ecx,5               // subtract 5 from ecx register

This is first converted simplistically into native instructions:

ld %r30,[%esp]       // load from stack, into temporary
add.c %eax,%eax,%r30 // add to %eax, set condition codes.
ld %r31,[%esp]
add.c %ebx,%ebx,%r31
ld %esi,[%ebp]
sub.c %ecx,%ecx,5

The optimizer then eliminates common sub-expressions and unnecessary condition code operations and, potentially, applies other optimizations such as loop unrolling:

ld %r30,[%esp]     // load from stack only once
add %eax,%eax,%r30
add %ebx,%ebx,%r30 // reuse data loaded earlier
ld %esi,[%ebp]
sub.c %ecx,%ecx,5  // only this last condition code needed

Finally, the optimizer groups individual instructions ("atoms") into long instruction words ("molecules") for the underlying hardware:

ld %r30,[%esp];  sub.c %ecx,%ecx,5
ld %esi,[%ebp];  add %eax,%eax,%r30;  add %ebx,%ebx,%r30

These two VLIW molecules could potentially execute in fewer cycles than the original instructions could on an x86 processor.

Transmeta claimed several technical benefits to this approach:

1. As the market leaders Intel and/or AMD would extend the core x86 instruction set, Transmeta could quickly upgrade their product with a software upgrade rather than requiring a respin of their hardware.
2. Performance and power can be tuned in software to meet market needs.
3. It would be relatively simple to fix hardware design or manufacturing flaws in the hardware using software workarounds.
4. More time could be spent concentrating on enhancing the capabilities of the core or reducing its power consumption without worrying about 33 years of backward compatibility with the x86 architecture.
5. The processor could emulate multiple other architectures, possibly even at the same time. (At its initial Crusoe launch, Transmeta demonstrated pico-Java and x86 running intermixed on the native hardware.)

Prior to Crusoe's release, rumors indicated Transmeta was relying on these benefits to develop a hybrid PowerPC and x86 processor. But Transmeta initially concentrated solely on the extremely low-power x86 market.

The ability to quickly update products without a hardware respin was demonstrated in 2002 with an in-the-field upgrade (a download) to enhance CPU performance of the Crusoe based HP Compaq TC1000 tablet PC. It was used again in 2004 when the Transmeta Efficeon product line added NX bit and SSE3 support without requiring hardware changes. In-the-field upgrades were rare in practice due to system hardware vendors not wanting to incur additional customer support costs or spend additional money on QA for the potential upgrades or bug fixes to shipped products they had already closed the revenue books on.

=== VLIW core ===
In conjunction with its code-morphing software, the Efficeon most closely mirrors the feature set of Intel Pentium 4 processors, although, like AMD Opteron processors, it supports a fully integrated memory controller, a HyperTransport IO bus, and the NX bit, or no-execute x86 extension to PAE mode. NX bit support is available starting with CMS version 6.0.4.

Efficeon's computational performance relative to mobile CPUs like the Intel Pentium M is thought to be lower, although little appears to be published about the relative performance of these competing processors.

Efficeon came in two package types: a 783- and a 592-contact ball grid array. Its power consumption was moderate (with some consuming as little as 3 watts at 1 GHz and 7 watts at 1.5 GHz), so it could be passively cooled.

Two generations of this chip were produced. The first generation (TM8600) was manufactured using a TSMC 130 nm process and produced with speeds up to 1.1 GHz. The second generation (TM8800 and TM8820) was manufactured using a Fujitsu 90 nm process and produced with speeds ranging from 1 GHz to 1.7 GHz.

Internally, the Efficeon had two arithmetic logic units, two load/store/add units, two execute units, two floating-point/MMX/SSE/SSE2 units, one branch prediction unit, one alias unit, and one control unit. The VLIW core could execute a 256-bit VLIW instruction per cycle. A VLIW is called a molecule and has room to store eight 32-bit instructions (called atoms) per cycle.

The Efficeon had a 128-KB L1 instruction cache, a 64-KB L1 data cache, and a 1-MB L2 cache, all on-die.

Additionally, Efficeon code morphing software (CMS) reserved a small portion of main memory (typically 32 MB) for its cache of dynamically translated x86 instructions.

=== Native compilation ===
In principle, it should be possible to optimize x86 code to favor Code Morphing Software, or even for compilers to target the native VLIW architecture directly. However, writing in 2003, Linus Torvalds (a former employee of Transmeta) apparently dismissed these approaches as unrealistic:

The native Crusoe code – even if it was documented and available – is not very conducive to general-purpose OS stuff. It has no notion of memory protection, and there's no MMU for code accesses, so things like kernel modules simply wouldn't work.

The translations are usually better than statically compiled native code (because the whole CPU is designed for speculation, and the static compilers don't know how to do that), and thus going to native mode is not necessarily a performance improvement.

So no, it wouldn't really benefit from it, not to mention that it's not even an option since Transmeta has never released enough details to do it anyway. Largely for simple security concerns – if you start giving interfaces for mucking around with the "microcode", you could do some really nasty things.

[...I meant...] "you cannot do that". And we won't even tell the details of how you cannot do that.

In fact, even inside Transmeta you cannot do that, without having a specially blessed version of the flash that allows upgrades. If you ever see a machine with a prominent notice saying "CMS upgraded to development version", then that's a hint that it's a machine that TMTA developers could change.

— Linus Torvalds, linux-kernel mailing list

Subsequent reverse engineering, published in 2004, clarifies some details of the native VLIW architecture and associated instruction set, and suggests that there are fundamental limitations that preclude porting an operating system such as Linux to it.

The same work also compares Transmeta's patented technology with prior art published and in some cases patented by IBM, and suggests that some claims might not stand detailed scrutiny.
