= Transmeta Efficeon =

General information
- Designed by: Transmeta Corporation

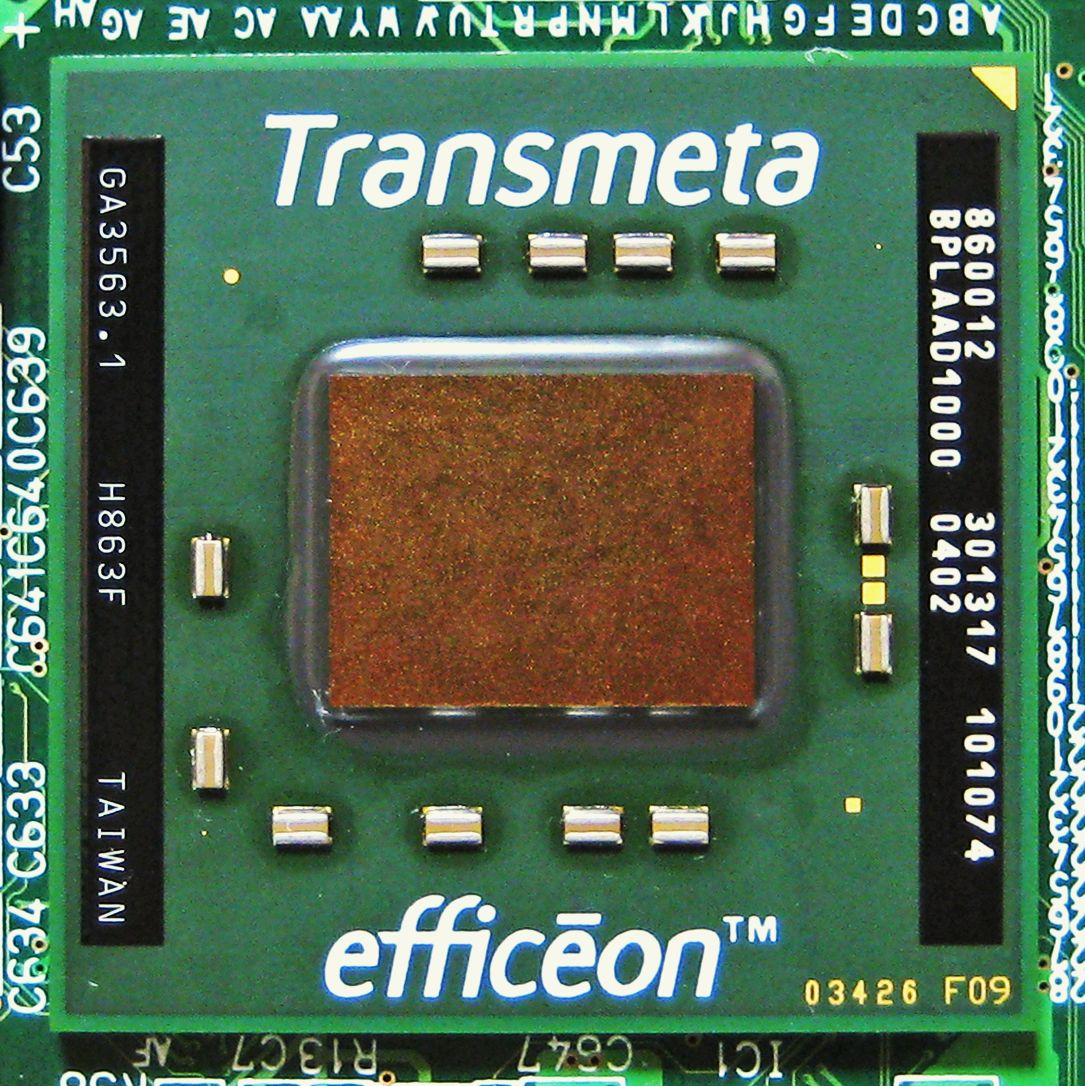
A Transmeta Efficeon processor

The Efficeon (stylized as efficēon) processor is Transmeta's second-generation 256-bit VLIW design released in 2004 which employs a software engine Code Morphing Software (CMS) to convert code written for x86 processors to the native instruction set of the chip. Like its predecessor, the Transmeta Crusoe (a 128-bit VLIW architecture), Efficeon stresses computational efficiency, low power consumption, and a low thermal footprint.

== Processor ==
Efficeon most closely mirrors the feature set of Intel Pentium 4 processors, although, like AMD Opteron processors, it supports a fully integrated memory controller, a HyperTransport IO bus, and the NX bit, or no-execute x86 extension to PAE mode. The Efficeon has a 128 KB L1 instruction cache, a 64 KB L1 data cache and a 1 MB L2 cache. All caches are on die. Additionally, the Efficeon CMS (code morphing software) reserves a small portion of main memory (typically 32 MB) for its translation cache of dynamically translated x86 instructions.

Efficeon's computational performance relative to mobile CPUs like the Intel Pentium M is thought to be lower, although little appears to be published about the relative performance of these competing processors.

Two generations of this chip were produced. The first generation (TM8600 and TM8620) was manufactured using a TSMC 0.13 micrometre process and produced at speeds up to 1.2 GHz. The second generation (TM8800 and TM8820) was manufactured using a Fujitsu 90 nm process and produced at speeds ranging from 1 GHz to 1.7 GHz. Efficeon came in two package types: the xx00 versions used a 783-contact ball grid array (BGA) and the xx20 versions used the smaller 592-contact BGA. Its power consumption is moderate (with some consuming as little as 3 watts at 1 GHz and 7 watts at 1.5 GHz), so it can be passively cooled.

Internally, the Efficeon has two arithmetic logic units, two load/store/add units, two execute units, two floating-point/MMX/SSE/SSE2 units, one branch prediction unit, one alias unit, and one control unit. The VLIW core can execute a 256-bit VLIW instruction per cycle, which is called a molecule, and has room to store eight 32-bit instructions (called atoms) per cycle. Code Morphing Software upgrades can add new instruction support, but CMS requires digital signatures of both Transmeta and the vendor and updates were not well distributed. NX bit support is available starting with CMS version 6.0.4 and SSE3 is added to the TM8800 by CMS 6.1.1-1.

All Transmeta processors were discontinued by October 2007.

== Products ==
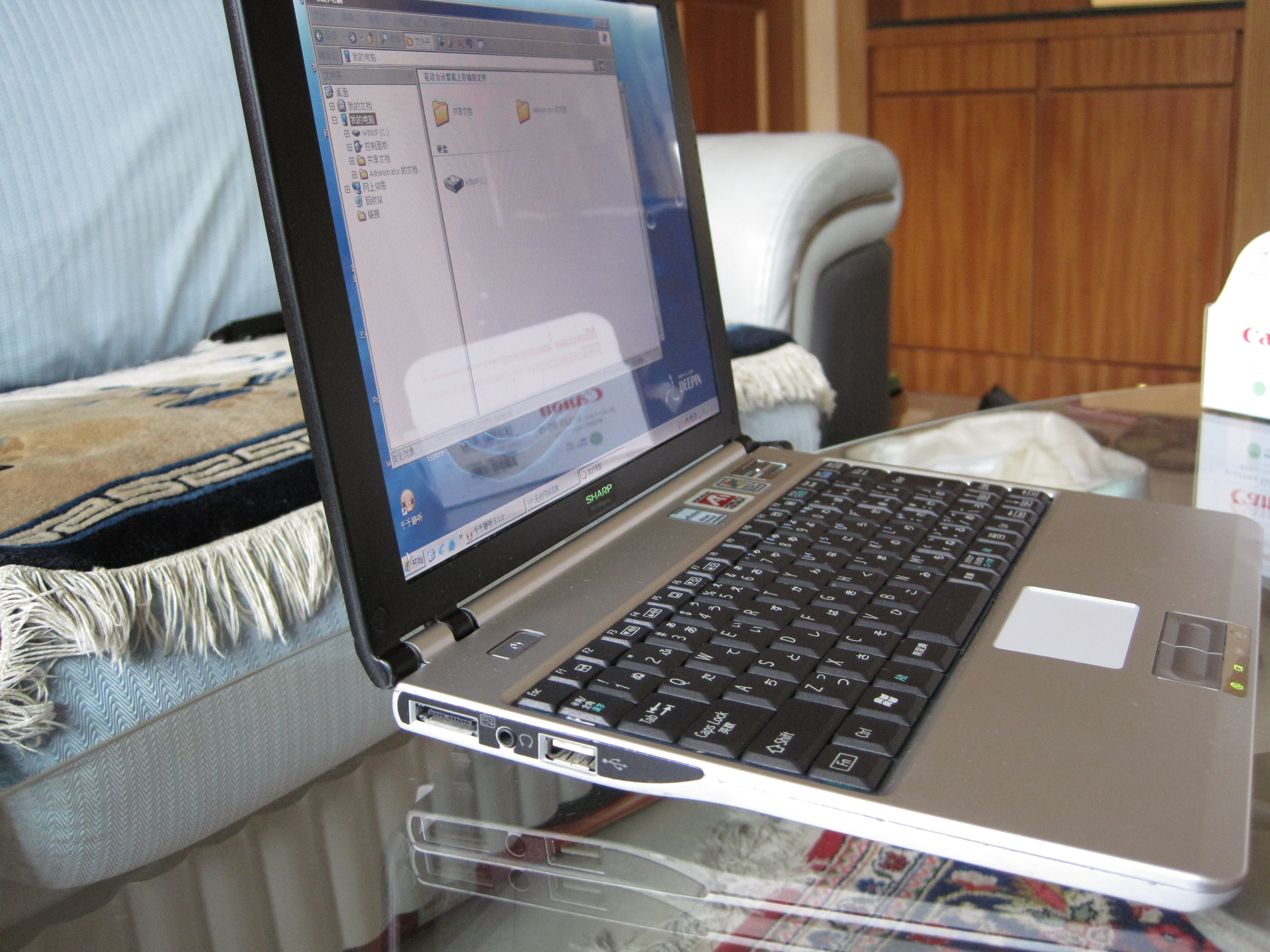
1 GHz Efficeon TM8600 used on Sharp Mebius MURAMASA / PC-MM2

- Elitegroup A532 (was also sold as IRu Stilo 1715L, Fudita Smart TM1000)
- HP T5710 thin client (1.2 ghz models PY704AA, PY705AA, and PY706AA)
- Microsoft FlexGo Computer (first generation used Efficeon SF23J with integrated security features, sometimes AMD branded)
- Nexus Technologies NXS15T POS Terminal
- Orion Multisystem Cluster Workstation
- Sharp Actius MM20, MP30, MP70G
- Sharp Mebius Muramasa PC-MM2, PC-CV50F
