= Pisonet =

Internet provision in the Philippines

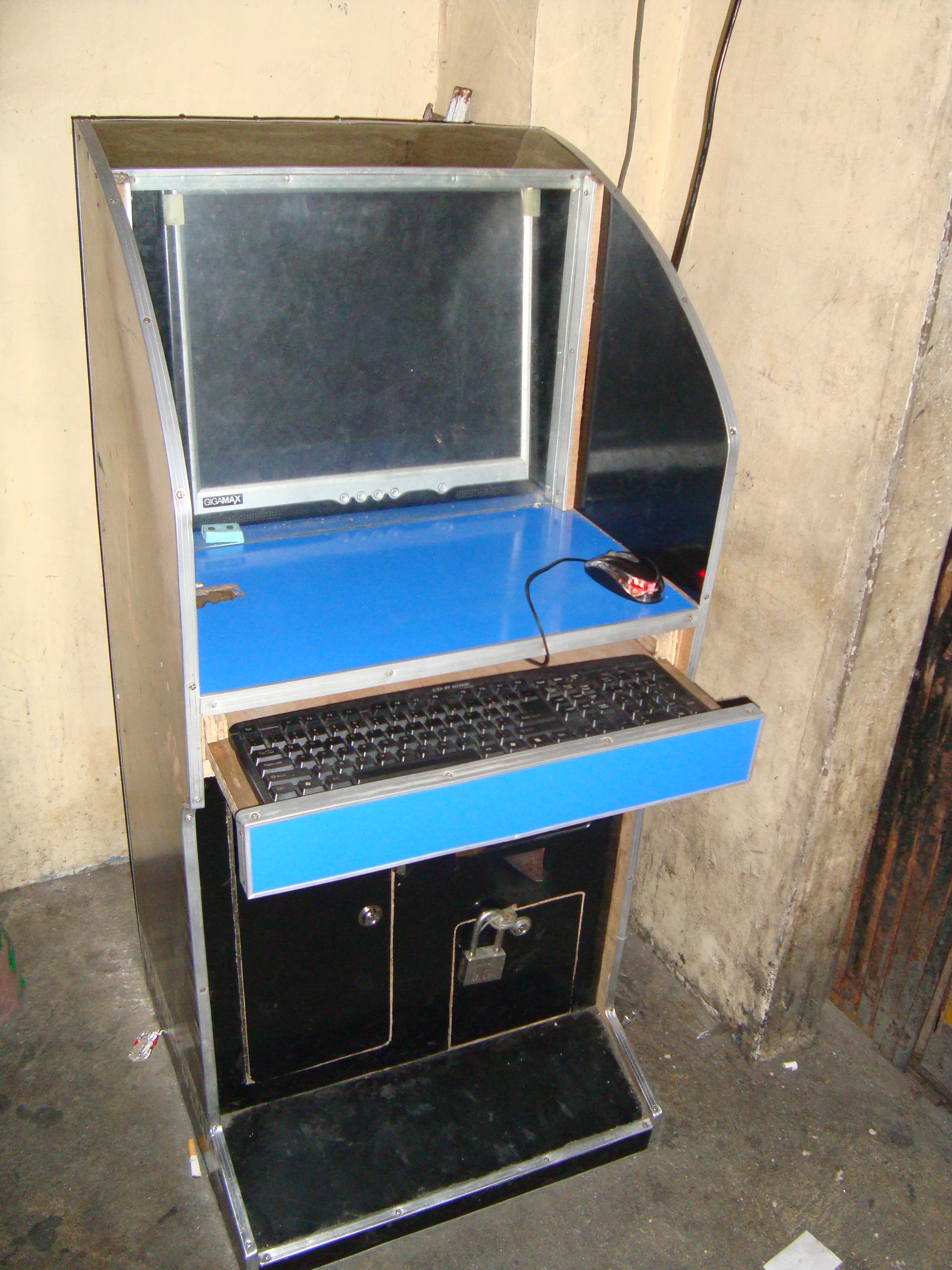
One of the first practical pisonet machines. Under the mouse is a keyboard stored in a keyboard tray that can be closed when the machine is not in use.

A pisonet is a ''mini-type'' internet cafe or computer shop mainly found in the areas of Metro Manila and the Philippines. Pisonet terminals are commonly used by Filipinos in lower-income groups as well as children as an inexpensive way to browse the internet and play video games.

The rates usually start from ₱10 (US$0.18) and can vary from cafe to cafe, with access to the computer or wireless access point given to the paying user for a limited time akin to an arcade machine.

== Construction ==
Pisonet machines are typically built from inexpensive desktop computers running Microsoft Windows, though some pisonet operators have also made arcade machine conversions of video game consoles such as Xbox 360s modified with pirated copies of popular games pre-installed.

=== Piso Wifi ===
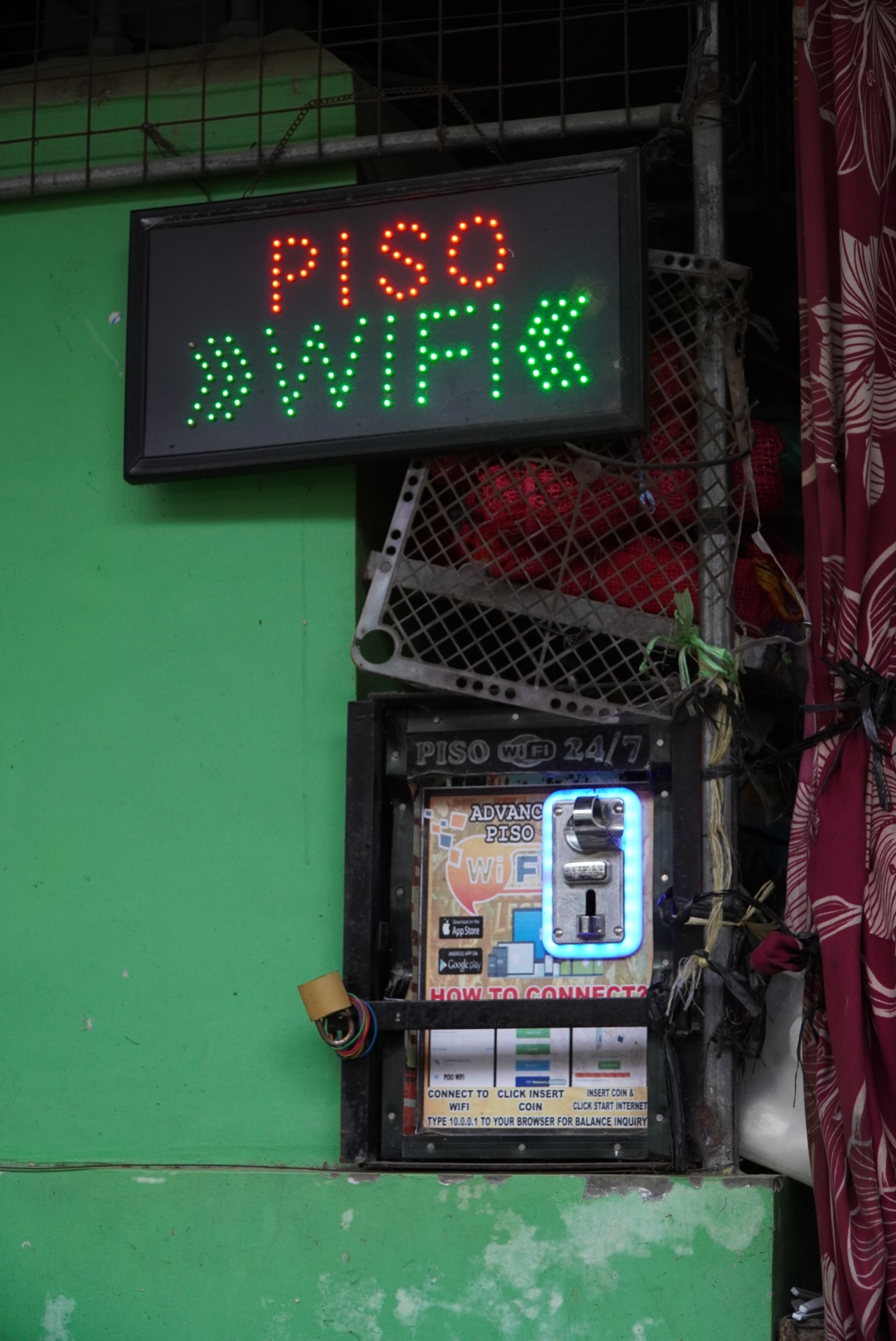
Coin-operated WiFi vending machine (Piso WiFi) in Batangas, Philippines (2025).

A variation of pisonet is the Piso Wifi vending machine, which is a wireless access point modified to allow paying customers to get wireless internet access on their mobile devices for a small fee.

These vending machines combine a coin-operated mechanism with wireless connectivity, allowing users to insert coins and gain internet access for a set amount of time. Piso WiFi systems are built with components like single-board computers (e.g., Raspberry Pi or Orange Pi), coin acceptors, microSD storage, and routers. They provide an inexpensive alternative to traditional internet subscriptions, making them especially popular in low-income communities and areas with limited connectivity.

Piso WiFi machines operate through a simple captive portal system. Users connect to the network and are redirected to a login page, where they can insert coins to activate their internet time. The system tracks usage and provides features like pausing time and inputting voucher codes for extended access.

=== Piso Tab ===
Another variation of pisonet is Piso Tab, which is a coin-operated tablet.

== History ==
Pisonet was invented during the early 2010s. Internet access has not improved much with 60% of poor neighborhoods in Manila lacking basic internet access. The COVID-19 pandemic in the country affected pisonet operations as lockdown rules significantly affected public gatherings including internet shops, on top of local telecommunications firms now offering subsidized access to popular social media services on mobile phones.

== Security and obscenity concerns ==
Owing to limited knowledge of technology and computer security by pisonet operators–most of them being middle-aged or elderly micro-entrepreneurs who also run sari-sari stores–user security and oversight over the patrons' use of the terminals are often lax, making it trivial for them to browse obscene material such as pornographic websites. As a result, crackdowns and regulations on pisonet terminals have been proposed in various cities and municipalities.

The city of Lapu-Lapu in Cebu also expressed plans to ban the operation of pisonet terminals owing to concerns over their use to browse pornographic material, though the proposed ordinance was opposed by city councilors who argued that the ban would unfairly affect lower-income youths who depend on inexpensive public internet access for school work.

== See also ==
- Microsoft FlexGo, a pay-as-you-go system for computers in developing countries
