= Microsoft FlexGo =

FlexGo was a technology developed by Microsoft to enable users to pay for using a full-featured personal computer based on the amount of time it used for, similar to pay as you go for cell phones. Another method of payment was a monthly subscription. It was introduced on May 21, 2006. IBM and other corporations were also adapting similar business models to expand into new markets. Microsoft began offering a Windows Vista based version of FlexGo in 2008.

FlexGo had two computing models, a pay-as-you-go model, and a subscription based model. Users would get full access to their PC once they paid. The PC would inform users as their time ran out, and would lock the user out if they did not pay to extend their time.

== Goals ==
FlexGo's main target audience was those in third world countries or people with unsteady income. It had been featured under a topic on Leo Laporte's This Week in Tech, Episode 57 "Vloggercon".

Microsoft wanted to give people the opportunity to buy their very first computer using FlexGo, and pay for only the time they would use it. Microsoft also planned to team up with telecommunication companies to allow internet access to become a pay as you go feature. The main targeted areas for FlexGo are India, Hungary, Vietnam, Slovenia, and Brazil.

== See also ==
- Pisonet, a type of vending machine in the Philippines which offers time-limited computer and internet access for a small fee
