= AMD FireStream =

Brand name by AMD

AMD FireStream was AMD's brand name for their Radeon-based product line targeting stream processing and/or GPGPU in supercomputers. Originally developed by ATI Technologies around the Radeon X1900 XTX in 2006, the product line was previously branded as both ATI FireSTREAM and AMD Stream Processor. The AMD FireStream can also be used as a floating-point co-processor for offloading CPU calculations, which is part of the Torrenza initiative. The FireStream line has been discontinued since 2012, when GPGPU workloads were entirely folded into the AMD FirePro line.

== Overview ==
The FireStream line is a series of add-on expansion cards released from 2006 to 2010, based on standard Radeon GPUs but designed to serve as a general-purpose co-processor, rather than rendering and outputting 3D graphics. Like the FireGL/FirePro line, they were given more memory and memory bandwidth, but the FireStream cards do not necessarily have video output ports. All support 32-bit single-precision floating point, and all but the first release support 64-bit double-precision. The line was partnered with new APIs to provide higher performance than existing OpenGL and Direct3D shader APIs could provide, beginning with Close to Metal, followed by OpenCL and the Stream Computing SDK, and eventually integrated into the APP SDK.

For highly parallel floating point math workloads, the cards can speed up large computations by more than 10 times; Folding@Home, the earliest and one of the most visible users of the GPGPU, obtained 20-40 times the CPU performance. Each pixel and vertex shader, or unified shader in later models, can perform arbitrary floating-point calculations.

== History ==
Following the release of the Radeon R520 and GeForce G70 GPU cores with programmable shaders, the large floating-point throughput drew attention from academic and commercial groups, experimenting with using then for non-graphics work. The interest led ATI (and Nvidia) to create GPGPU products — able to calculate general purpose mathematical formulas in a massively parallel way — to process heavy calculations traditionally done on CPUs and specialized floating-point math co-processors. GPGPUs were projected to have immediate performance gains of a factor of 10 or more, over compared to contemporary multi-socket CPU-only calculation.

With the development of the high-performance X1900 XFX nearly finished, ATI based its first Stream Processor design on it, announcing it as the upcoming ATI FireSTREAM together with the new Close to Metal API at SIGGRAPH 2006. The core itself was mostly unchanged, except for doubling the onboard memory and bandwidth, similar to the FireGL V7350; new driver and software support made up most of the difference. Folding@home began using the X1900 for general computation, using a pre-release of version 6.5 of the ATI Catalyst driver, and reported 20-40x improvement in GPU over CPU. The first product was released in late 2006, rebranded as AMD Stream Processor after the merger with AMD.

The brand became AMD FireStream with the second generation of stream processors in 2007, based on the RV650 chip with new unified shaders and double precision support. Asynchronous DMA also improved performance by allowing a larger memory pool without the CPU's help. One model was released, the 9170, for the initial price of $1999. Plans included the development of a stream processor on an MXM module by 2008, for laptop computing, but was never released.

The third-generation quickly followed in 2008 with dramatic performance improvements from the RV770 core; the 9250 had nearly double the performance of the 9170, and became the first single-chip teraflop processor, despite dropping the price to under $1000. A faster sibling, the 9270, was released shortly after, for $1999.

In 2010 the final generation of FireStreams came out, the 9350 and 9370 cards, based on the Cypress chip featured in the HD 5800. This generation again doubled the performance relative to the previous, to 2 teraflops in the 9350 and 2.6 teraflops in the 9370, and was the first built from the ground up for OpenCL. This generation was also the only one to feature fully passive cooling, and active cooling was unavailable.

The Northern and Southern Islands generations were skipped.

FireStream was succeeded by the FirePro product line, based on the Graphics Core Next microarchitecture.

== Models ==
- FireStream 9170 include Direct3D 10.1, OpenGL 3.3 and APP Stream
- FireStream 92x0 include Direct3D 10.1, OpenGL 3.3 and OpenCL 1.0
- FireStream 93x0 include Direct3D 11, OpenGL 4.3 and OpenCL 1.2 with Last Driver updates

Model (Codename)	Launch	Architecture (Fab)	Bus interface	Stream processors	Clock rate		Memory				Processing power (Note: Precision performance is calculated from the base (or boost) core clock speed based on a FMA operation.) (GFLOPS)		TDP (Watts)
Model (Codename)	Launch	Architecture (Fab)	Bus interface	Stream processors	Core (MHz)	Memory (MHz)	Size (MB)	Type	Bus width (bit)	Bandwidth (GB/s)	Single	Double	TDP (Watts)
Stream Processor (R580)	2006	R500; 80 nm		240	600		1024	GDDR3	256	83.2	375	N/A	165
FireStream 9170 (RV670)	November 8, 2007	TeraScale 1; 55 nm	PCIe 2.0 x16	320	800	800	2048	GDDR3	256	51.2	512	102.4	105
FireStream 9250 (RV770)	June 16, 2008	TeraScale 1; 55 nm	PCIe 2.0 x16	800	625	993	1024	GDDR3	256	63.6	1000	200	150
FireStream 9270 (RV770)	November 13, 2008	TeraScale 1; 55 nm	PCIe 2.0 x16	800	750	850	2048	GDDR5	256	108.8	1200	240	160
FireStream 9350 (Cypress XT)	June 23, 2010	TeraScale 2; 40 nm	PCIe 2.1 x16	1440	700	1000	2048	GDDR5	256	128	2016	403.2	150
FireStream 9370 (Cypress XT)	June 23, 2010	TeraScale 2; 40 nm	PCIe 2.1 x16	1600	825	1150	4096	GDDR5	256	147.2	2640	528	225

== Software ==
The AMD FireStream was launched with a wide range of software platform support. One of the supporting firms was PeakStream (acquired by Google in June 2007), who was first to provide an open beta version of software to support CTM and AMD FireStream as well as x86 and Cell (Cell Broadband Engine) processors. The FireStream was claimed to be 20 times faster in typical applications than regular CPUs after running PeakStream's software. RapidMind also provided stream processing software that worked with ATI and NVIDIA, as well as Cell processors.

=== Software Development Kit ===
After abandoning their short-lived Close to Metal API, AMD focused on OpenCL. AMD first released its Stream Computing SDK (v1.0), in December 2007 under the AMD EULA, to be run on Windows XP. The SDK includes "Brook+", an AMD hardware optimized version of the Brook language developed by Stanford University, itself a variant of the ANSI C (C language), open-sourced and optimized for stream computing. The AMD Core Math Library (ACML) and AMD Performance Library (APL) with optimizations for the AMD FireStream and the COBRA video library (further renamed as "Accelerated Video Transcoding" or AVT) for video transcoding acceleration will also be included. Another important part of the SDK, the Compute Abstraction Layer (CAL), is a software development layer aimed for low-level access, through the CTM hardware interface, to the GPU architecture for performance tuning software written in various high-level programming languages.

In August 2011, AMD released version 2.5 of the ATI APP Software Development Kit, which includes support for OpenCL 1.1, a parallel computing language developed by the Khronos Group. The concept of compute shaders, officially called DirectCompute, in Microsoft's next generation API called DirectX 11 is already included in graphics drivers with DirectX 11 support.

== Benchmarks ==
According to an AMD-demonstrated system with two dual-core AMD Opteron processors and two Radeon R600 GPU cores running on Microsoft Windows XP Professional, 1 teraflop (TFLOP) can be achieved by a universal multiply-add (MADD) calculation. By comparison, an Intel Core 2 Quad Q9650 3.0 GHz processor at the time could achieve 48 GFLOPS.

In a demonstration of Kaspersky SafeStream anti-virus scanning that had been optimized for AMD stream processors, was able to scan 21 times faster with the R670 based acceleration than with search running entirely on an Opteron, in 2007.

== Limitations ==
- Recursive functions are not supported in Brook+ because all function calls are inlined at compile time. Using CAL, functions (recursive or otherwise) are supported to 32 levels.
- Only bilinear texture filtering is supported; mipmapped textures and anisotropic filtering are not supported.
- Functions cannot have a variable number of arguments. The same problem occurs for recursive functions.
- Conversion of floating-point numbers to integers on GPUs is done differently than on x86 CPUs; it is not fully IEEE-754 compliant.
- Doing "global synchronization" on the GPU is not very efficient, which forces the GPU to divide the kernel and do synchronization on the CPU. Given the variable number of multiprocessors and other factors, there may not be a perfect solution to this problem.
- The bus bandwidth and latency between the CPU and the GPU may become a bottleneck.

== See also ==
- Stream Processing
- ROCm
- Heterogeneous System Architecture
- NVIDIA Tesla, Nvidia's high-performance computing (HPC) GPU product line
- Intel Xeon Phi, Intel's non-GPU HPC solution
- AMD FirePro, the GCN-based successor to FireStream
- AMD Instinct, the CDNA-based successor to FirePro
- Open Computing Language (OpenCL) – an industry standard
- Compute Unified Device Architecture (CUDA) - a proprietary Nvidia-only solution
- List of AMD graphics processing units
