= Close to Metal =

Low level GPGPU programming interface

In computing, Close To Metal (CTM, originally Close-to-the-Metal) is the name of a beta version of a low-level programming interface developed by ATI, now the AMD Graphics Product Group, aimed at enabling GPGPU computing. CTM was short-lived, and the first production version of AMD's GPGPU technology is now called AMD Stream SDK, or rather the current AMD APP SDK (AMD Accelerated Parallel Processing SDK) ) for Windows and Linux 32-bit and 64-bit, which also targets Heterogeneous System Architecture.

== Overview ==
Close To Metal, originally called THIN (Thin Hardware INterface) and Data Parallel Virtual Machine, gave developers direct access to the native instruction set and memory of the massively parallel computational elements in modern AMD video cards. CTM bypassed the graphics-centric DirectX and OpenGL APIs for the GPGPU programmer to expose previously unavailable low-level functionality, including direct control of the stream processors/ALUs and the memory controllers. R580 (ATI X1900) and later generations of AMD's GPU microarchitecture supported the CTM interface.

CTM's commercial successor, AMD Stream SDK, was released under AMD EULA in December 2007 after the software stack was rewritten. Stream SDK provides high-level in addition to low-level tools for general-purpose access to AMD graphics hardware.

Using GPUs to perform computations holds a lot of potential for some applications because of the fundamental differences of GPU microarchitectures compared to CPUs. GPUs achieve much greater throughput (calculations per second) by executing many programs in parallel and restricting flow control (the ability of one program to execute instructions independently of another). Modern GPUs also have addressable on-die memory and extremely high performance multi-channel external memory.

AMD subsequently switched from CTM to OpenCL.

== Open-source ==
Some components of CTM and the Stream SDK are open source, such as the Brook+ C-like language and compiler.

== See also ==
- ROCm
- CUDA
- BrookGPU
- Lib Sh
- Stream programming
- Shader
