= Lib Sh =

Sh was an early metaprogramming language for programmable GPUs. It offered a general-purpose programming language, following a stream-processing model. Programs written in Sh could either run on CPUs or GPUs, obviating the need to write programs in a mix of two programming languages as was the case with earlier GPU programming systems such as Cg or HLSL.

As of August 2006, it is no longer maintained. RapidMind Inc. was formed to commercialize the research behind Sh. RapidMind was then bought by Intel and ceased Sh development as well.

== See also ==
- BrookGPU
- CUDA
- Close to Metal
- OpenCL
- RapidMind
