= Intel Array Building Blocks =

C++ programming library developed by Intel Corporation

- Developer(s): Intel
- Initial release: May 17, 2010
- Preview release: 1.0 beta 6 / August 25, 2011
- Written in: C++
- Operating system: Windows, Linux
- Type: library or framework
- Website: software.intel.com/en-us/articles/intel-array-building-blocks

Intel Array Building Blocks (also known as ArBB) was a C++ library developed by Intel Corporation for exploiting data parallel portions of programs to take advantage of multi-core processors, graphics processing units and Intel Many Integrated Core Architecture processors. ArBB provides a generalized vector parallel programming solution designed to avoid direct dependencies on particular low-level parallelism mechanisms or hardware architectures. ArBB is oriented to applications that require data-intensive mathematical computations. By default, ArBB programs cannot create data races or deadlocks.

== History ==
Intel Ct was a parallel programming model developed by Intel in 2007 for its future multi-core processors as part of the Tera-Scale research program. In April 2009, Intel announced that "Ct [is] to appear in programmer tools by end of the year". On August 19, 2009, Intel acquired RapidMind, a privately held company founded and headquartered in Waterloo, Ontario, Canada. In September 2010, Intel Array Building Blocks (ArBB) were introduced as the result of the merger of Intel Ct and RapidMind technologies. The first version of ArBB supported Microsoft Windows and Linux, and Intel, Microsoft Visual C++ and GCC C++ compilers.

In October 2012 the project was discontinued in favour of other Intel projects: Cilk Plus and Threading Building Blocks.

== See also ==
- Cilk/Cilk Plus
- Intel Concurrent Collections
- Intel Array Visualizer
- Intel Parallel Building Blocks
- Intel Parallel Studio
- Intel Developer Zone (support and discussion)
- Threading Building Blocks (TBB)
- Parallel computing
