= Stefanus Du Toit =

Stefanus Du Toit is a South African inventor and entrepreneur and a co-founder of Waterloo-based RapidMind, a company specializing in the development of software that automatically parallelizes serial code. The technology behind Rapidmind was developed by Du Toit during his graduate research at the University of Waterloo. As of 2008, RapidMind has raised $10M in venture capital financing. RapidMind was acquired by Intel in 2009. In 2008 Du Toit was honored by being included in the MIT Technology Review's TR35 list.
