= ArrayFire =

American software company

- Company type: Private
- Industry: High-performance computing
- Founded: June 2007
- Headquarters: 3520 Piedmont Rd NE; Suite 415; Atlanta, Georgia 30305; United States
- Key people: John Melonakos (CEO)
- Products: Computer software
- Website: arrayfire.com

ArrayFire is an American software company that develops programming tools for parallel computing and graphics on graphics processing unit (GPU) chipsets. Its products are particularly popular in the defense industry.

== Products ==
The company's first major product was Jacket, a library that extends MATLAB with GPGPU capabilities on CUDA-enabled Nvidia GPUs, released in June 2008 (version 1.0 in January 2009).

Jacket was followed by ArrayFire, a similar GPGPU extension for C, C++ and Fortran.

ArrayFire is partially funded by DARPA, who uses it in its "Memex" dark web search software.

Since version 3.4 the library is Open Source.
