= Intel Parallel Building Blocks =

Parallel Building Blocks
- Paradigm: imperative (procedural), structured, parallel
- Designed by: Intel
- Developer: Intel
- First appeared: 2010
- Stable release: Parallel Studio 2010 / September 2, 2010
- Typing discipline: static, weak, manifest
- Website: software.intel.com/en-us/articles/intel-parallel-building-blocks

Influenced by
- Cilk Plus, Threading Building Blocks, Intel Array Building Blocks

Intel Parallel Building Blocks (PBB) was a collection of three programming solutions designed for multithreaded parallel computing. PBB consisted of Cilk Plus, Threading Building Blocks (TBB) and Intel Array Building Blocks (ArBB).

== See also ==
- Intel Parallel Studio
- Intel Concurrent Collections (CnC)
- Intel Developer Zone (Intel DZ; support and discussion)
