= Telchemy =

American software technology developer

Telchemy (est 1999) is an American software technology developer that is focused on real time analytics. They are best known for their VQmon performance monitoring software, which is a widely used call quality analysis technology licensed by third parties, and their SQmediator management platform. They also provide edge analytics technology for IoT devices, sensors and gateways.

== History ==
Telchemy, Incorporated was founded in 1999 by Dr. Alan Clark. The first product concept, VQmon, was developed in early 2000, as a result of an identified need to monitor the quality of live Voice over IP calls.

In 2001 Telchemy moved to Suwanee, Georgia. In 2006 they moved to Duluth, Georgia. In December 2019, Telchemy moved to Alpharetta, Georgia. In 2001 Telchemy introduced the first release of VQmon and by December 2013 had sold more than 150 million units.

Telchemy developed a single ended voice and video analytics technology suitable for monitoring live telecom services, and implemented this in a form suitable for direct integration into IP phones and chipsets.

The company has made contributions to international standards in the field of VoIP performance management.
