= Intel Ct =

Intel Ct is a programming model developed by Intel to ease the exploitation of its future multicore chips, as demonstrated by the Tera-Scale research program.

It is based on the exploitation of SIMD to produce automatically parallelized programs.

On August 19, 2009, Intel acquired RapidMind, a privately held company founded and headquartered in Waterloo, Ontario, Canada. RapidMind and Ct combined into a successor named Intel Array Building Blocks (ArBB) released in September 2010.
