= RapidMind =

Defunct Canadian software company

RapidMind Inc.
- Company type: Private
- Industry: Computer software
- Founded: Waterloo, Ontario, 2004
- Founder: Michael McCool; Stefanus Du Toit
- Defunct: August 19, 2009
- Fate: Acquired
- Headquarters: Waterloo, Ontario, Canada
- Key people: Ray DePaul (CEO); Stefanus Du Toit (Chief Architect); Michael McCool (Chief Scientist); Matthew Monteyne (VP, Marketing); Ray Newmark (VP, Sales)
- Products: RapidMind Multi-core Development Platform
- Website: RapidMind.com

RapidMind Inc. was a privately held company founded and headquartered in Waterloo, Ontario, Canada, acquired by Intel in 2009. It provided a software product that aims to make it simpler for software developers to target multi-core processors and accelerators such as graphics processing units (GPUs).

== History ==
RapidMind was started in 2004 based on the academic research related to the Sh project at the University of Waterloo. It received a seed round of financing (amount undisclosed) at the beginning of 2006, and raised its Series A round of $10 million Canadian in April 2007.

RapidMind was acquired by Intel on 19 August 2009. Intel continued to sell RapidMind's primary product, a Multi-core Development Platform, through 2010. The RapidMind team and technology was integrated into the Intel Ct research project. The results of the combination were introduced in September 2010 as Intel Array Building Blocks.

== Multi-core development platform ==
The platform was exposed as a set of C++ libraries, which provide types and operations used to express parallel computations. The programming model was primarily data parallel, although it was sufficiently generic to express task-parallel operations. The platform targeted multi-core x86 processors, GPUs (via OpenCL), and the Cell processor.

== See also ==
- Intel Array Building Blocks
- Intel Ct
- OpenCL
- BrookGPU
