= RaftLib =

- Original author: Jonathan Beard
- Release: late 2014
- Stable release: 0.9 / January 2020
- Preview release: 1.0a / May 18, 2020; 6 years ago
- Written in: C++
- Operating system: Linux, macOS, Windows
- Type: Data analytics, HPC, Signal Processing, Machine Learning, Algorithms, Big Data
- License: Apache License 2.0
- Website: www.raftlib.io

RaftLib is a portable parallel processing system that aims to provide extreme performance while increasing programmer productivity. It enables a programmer to assemble a massively parallel program (both local and distributed) using simple iostream-like operators. RaftLib handles threading, memory allocation, memory placement, and auto-parallelization of compute kernels. It enables applications to be constructed from chains of compute kernels forming a task and pipeline parallel compute graph. Programs are authored in C++ (although other language bindings are planned).

== Example ==
Here is a Hello World example for demonstration purposes:

import <raft>;
import <raftio>;

import std;

using String = std::string;

using RaftKernel = raft::kernel;
using RaftKernelStatus = raft::kstatus;
using RaftMap = raft::map;
using RaftPrint = raft::print;

class HelloWorld : public RaftKernel {
public:
    HelloWorld() {
        output.addPort<String>("0"); 
    }

    virtual RaftKernelStatus run() {
        output["0"].push("Hello World\n");
        return raft::stop; 
    }
};

int main(int argc, char* argv[]) {
    // instantiate print kernel
    RaftPrint<String> p;

    // instantiate hello world kernel
    HelloWorld hello;

    // make a map object
    RaftMap m;

    // add kernels to map, both hello and p are executed concurrently
    m += hello >> p;

    // execute the map
    m.exe();

    return 0;
}
