= CUDA =

Parallel computing platform and programming model

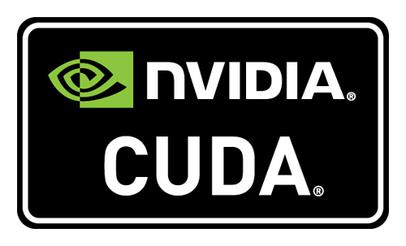
- Original authors: Ian Buck; John Nickolls
- Developer: Nvidia
- Release: February 16, 2007; 19 years ago
- Stable release: 13.4.1 / 9 September 2026; 2 months ago
- Written in: C
- Operating system: Windows, Linux
- Platform: Supported GPUs
- Type: GPGPU
- License: Proprietary
- Website: developer.nvidia.com/cuda-zone

CUDA (Compute Unified Device Architecture) is a proprietary parallel computing platform and application programming interface (API) developed by Nvidia that allows software to use certain types of graphics processing units (GPUs) for accelerated general-purpose processing, significantly broadening their utility in artificial intelligence, scientific and high-performance computing. CUDA was created in 2004 and was officially released in 2007. When introduced, the name was an acronym for Compute Unified Device Architecture, but Nvidia later dropped the initial meaning of the acronym and now rarely expands it.

CUDA is both a software layer that manages data, giving direct access to the GPU and CPU as necessary, and a library of APIs that enable parallel computation. In addition to drivers and runtime kernels, the CUDA platform includes compilers, libraries and developer tools to help programmers.

CUDA is written in the C programming language, but is designed to work with other programming languages including C++, Fortran, Python and Julia. This accessibility makes it easier for specialists in parallel programming to use GPU resources, in contrast to prior APIs like Direct3D and OpenGL, which require advanced skills in graphics programming. CUDA-powered GPUs support programming frameworks such as OpenMP, OpenACC and OpenCL.

== Graphics processing unit ==
The graphics processing unit (GPU) is a specialized processor. It addresses the demands of real-time high-resolution, compute-intensive tasks such as 3D graphics. By 2012, GPUs had evolved into highly parallel multi-core systems allowing efficient manipulation of large blocks of data. This design is more effective than general-purpose central processing unit (CPUs) for algorithms in situations where processing large blocks of data is done in parallel, such as:

- cryptographic hash functions
- machine learning
- molecular dynamics simulations
- physics engines

== History ==
CUDA traces to the early 2000s, when Ian Buck, a computer science PhD student at Stanford University, began experimenting with using GPUs for purposes beyond rendering graphics. Buck had become interested in GPUs during his undergraduate studies at Princeton University, initially through video gaming. After graduation, he interned at Nvidia, gaining deeper exposure to GPU architecture. At Stanford, he built an 8K gaming rig using 32 GeForce graphics cards, originally to push the limits of graphics performance in games like Quake and Doom. However, his interests shifted toward exploring the potential of GPUs for general-purpose parallel computing.

To that end, Buck developed Brook, a programming language designed to enable general-purpose computing on GPUs. His work attracted support from Nvidia and the Defense Advanced Research Projects Agency (DARPA). In 2004, Nvidia hired Buck and paired him with John Nickolls, then director of architecture for GPU computing. Together, they began transforming Brook into CUDA. CUDA was officially released in 2007.

CUDA became central to the company's strategy of positioning GPUs as versatile hardware for scientific applications. By 2015, CUDA's development increasingly focused on accelerating machine learning and artificial neural network workloads.

== Ontology ==
The following table offers an approximate summary of the CUDA ontology.

Ontology of CUDA framework
memory (hardware)	memory (code, or variable scoping)	computation (hardware)	computation (code syntax)	computation (code semantics)
RAM	non-CUDA variables	host	program	one routine call
VRAM, GPU L2 cache	global, const, texture	device	grid	simultaneous call of the same subroutine on many processors
GPU L1 cache	local, shared	SM ("streaming multiprocessor")	block	individual subroutine call
		warp = 32 threads		SIMD instructions
GPU L0 cache, register		thread (aka. "SP", "streaming processor", "cuda core", but these names are now deprecated)		analogous to individual scalar ops within a vector op

== Programming abilities ==
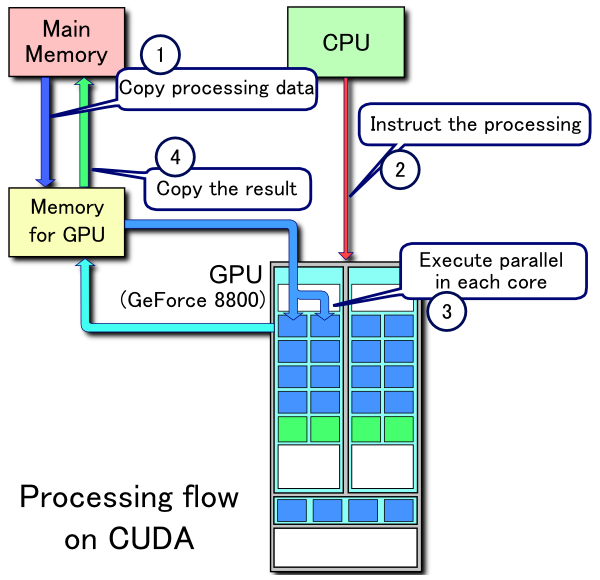
Example of CUDA processing flow: 1. Copy data from main memory to GPU memory; 2. CPU initiates the GPU compute kernel; 3. GPU's CUDA cores execute the kernel in parallel; 4. Copy the resulting data from GPU memory to main memory

The CUDA platform is accessible to software developers through CUDA-accelerated libraries, compiler directives such as OpenACC, and extensions to industry-standard programming languages including C, C++, Fortran and Python. C/C++ programmers can use 'CUDA C/C++', compiled to PTX with nvcc (Nvidia's LLVM-based C/C++ compiler) or by clang itself. Fortran programmers can use 'CUDA Fortran', compiled with the PGI CUDA Fortran compiler from The Portland Group. Python programmers can use the cuPyNumeric library to accelerate applications on Nvidia GPUs.

In addition to libraries, compiler directives, CUDA C/C++ and CUDA Fortran, the CUDA platform supports other computational interfaces, including the Khronos Group's OpenCL, Microsoft's DirectCompute, OpenGL Compute Shader and C++ AMP. Third party wrappers are also available for Python, Perl, Fortran, Java, Ruby, Lua, Common Lisp, Haskell, R, MATLAB, IDL, Julia, and native support in Mathematica.

In the computer game industry, GPUs are used for graphics rendering, and for game physics calculations (physical effects such as debris, smoke, fire, fluids); examples include PhysX and Bullet. CUDA has also been used to accelerate non-graphical applications in computational biology, cryptography and other fields by an order of magnitude or more.

CUDA provides both a low level API (CUDA Driver API, non single-source) and a higher level API (CUDA Runtime API, single-source). The initial CUDA SDK was made public on 15 February 2007, for Microsoft Windows and Linux. Mac OS X support was later added in version 2.0, which supersedes the beta released February 14, 2008. CUDA works with all Nvidia GPUs from the G8x series onwards, including GeForce, Quadro and the Tesla line. CUDA is compatible with most standard operating systems.

CUDA 8.0 comes with the following libraries (for compilation & runtime, in alphabetical order):

- cuBLAS – CUDA Basic Linear Algebra Subroutines library
- CUDART – CUDA Runtime library
- cuFFT – CUDA Fast Fourier Transform library
- cuRAND – CUDA Random Number Generation library
- cuSOLVER – CUDA based collection of dense and sparse direct solvers
- cuSPARSE – CUDA Sparse Matrix library
- NPP – NVIDIA Performance Primitives library
- nvGRAPH – NVIDIA Graph Analytics library
- NVML – NVIDIA Management Library
- NVRTC – NVIDIA Runtime Compilation library for CUDA C++

CUDA 8.0 comes with these other software components:

- nView – NVIDIA nView Desktop Management Software
- NVWMI – NVIDIA Enterprise Management Toolkit
- GameWorks PhysX – is a multi-platform game physics engine

CUDA 9.0–9.2 comes with these other components:

- CUTLASS 1.0 – custom linear algebra algorithms,
- NVIDIA Video Decoder was deprecated in CUDA 9.2; it is now available in NVIDIA Video Codec SDK

CUDA 10 comes with these other components:

- nvJPEG – Hybrid (CPU and GPU) JPEG processing

CUDA 11.0–11.8 comes with these other components:

- CUB is new one of more supported C++ libraries
- MIG multi instance GPU support
- nvJPEG2000 – JPEG 2000 encoder and decoder

== Advantages ==
CUDA has several advantages over traditional general-purpose computation on GPUs (GPGPU) using graphics APIs:

- Scattered reads – code can read from arbitrary addresses in memory
- Unified virtual memory (CUDA 4.0 and above)
- Unified memory (CUDA 6.0 and above)
- Shared memory – CUDA exposes a fast shared memory region that can be shared among threads. This can be used as a user-managed cache, enabling higher bandwidth than is possible using texture lookups.
- Faster downloads and readbacks to and from the GPU
- Full support for integer and bitwise operations, including integer texture lookups

== Limitations ==
- Whether for the host computer or the GPU device, all CUDA source code is now processed according to C++ syntax rules. This was not always the case. Earlier versions of CUDA were based on C syntax rules. As with the more general case of compiling C code with a C++ compiler, it is therefore possible that old C-style CUDA source code will either fail to compile or will not behave as originally intended.
- Interoperability with rendering languages such as OpenGL is one-way, with OpenGL having access to registered CUDA memory but CUDA not having access to OpenGL memory.
- Copying between host and device memory may incur a performance hit due to system bus bandwidth and latency (this can be partly alleviated with asynchronous memory transfers, handled by the GPU's DMA engine).
- Threads should be running in groups of at least 32 for best performance, with total number of threads numbering in the thousands. Branches in the program code do not affect performance significantly, provided that each of 32 threads takes the same execution path; the SIMD execution model becomes a significant limitation for any inherently divergent task (e.g. traversing a space partitioning data structure during ray tracing).
- No emulation or fallback functionality is available for modern revisions.
- Valid C++ may sometimes be flagged and prevent compilation due to the way the compiler approaches optimization for target GPU device limitations.
- C++ run-time type information (RTTI) and C++-style exception handling are only supported in host code, not in device code.
- In single-precision on first generation CUDA compute capability 1.x devices, denormal numbers are unsupported and are instead flushed to zero, and the precision of both the division and square root operations are slightly lower than IEEE 754-compliant single precision math. Devices that support compute capability 2.0 and above support denormal numbers, and the division and square root operations are IEEE 754 compliant by default. However, users can obtain the prior faster gaming-grade math of compute capability 1.x devices if desired by setting compiler flags to disable accurate divisions and accurate square roots, and enable flushing denormal numbers to zero.
- Unlike OpenCL, CUDA-enabled GPUs are only available from Nvidia as it is proprietary. Attempts to implement CUDA on other GPUs include:
  - Project Coriander: Converts CUDA C++11 source to OpenCL 1.2 C. A fork of CUDA-on-CL intended to run TensorFlow.
  - CU2CL: Convert CUDA 3.2 C++ to OpenCL C.
  - GPUOpen HIP: A thin abstraction layer on top of CUDA and ROCm intended for AMD and Nvidia GPUs. Has a conversion tool for importing CUDA C++ source. Supports CUDA 4.0 plus C++11 and float16.
  - ZLUDA is a drop-in replacement for CUDA on AMD GPUs and formerly Intel GPUs with near-native performance. The developer, Andrzej Janik, was separately contracted by both Intel and AMD to develop the software in 2021 and 2022, respectively. However, neither company decided to release it officially due to the lack of a business use case. AMD's contract included a clause that allowed Janik to release his code for AMD independently, allowing him to release the new version that only supports AMD GPUs.
  - ChipStar can compile and run CUDA/HIP programs on advanced OpenCL 3.0 or Level Zero platforms.
  - SCALE is a CUDA-compatible programming toolkit for ahead of time compilation of CUDA source code on AMD GPUs, aiming to expand support for other GPUs in the future.

== Example ==
This example code in C++ loads a texture from an image into an array on the GPU:

void foo()
{
    cudaArray* cu_array = nullptr;

    // Allocate array
    cudaChannelFormatDesc description = cudaCreateChannelDesc<float>();
    cudaMallocArray(&cu_array, &description, width, height);

    // Copy image data to array
    cudaMemcpy2DToArray(cu_array, 0, 0,
                        image, width * sizeof(float),
                        width * sizeof(float), height,
                        cudaMemcpyHostToDevice);

    // Resource description (what the texture points to)
    cudaResourceDesc resDesc = {};
    resDesc.resType           = cudaResourceTypeArray;
    resDesc.res{.array{.array = cu_array}};

    // Texture description (sampling parameters)
    cudaTextureDesc texDesc = {};
    texDesc.addressMode      = {cudaAddressModeClamp, cudaAddressModeClamp};
    texDesc.filterMode       = cudaFilterModePoint;
    texDesc.readMode         = cudaReadModeElementType;
    texDesc.normalizedCoords = 0; // use unnormalized integer coordinates

    // Create the texture object
    cudaTextureObject_t texObj = 0;
    cudaCreateTextureObject(&texObj, &resDesc, &texDesc, nullptr);

    // Run kernel - pass the texture object as a parameter
    dim3 blockDim(16, 16, 1);
    dim3 gridDim((width  + blockDim.x - 1) / blockDim.x,
                 (height + blockDim.y - 1) / blockDim.y, 1);
    kernel<<<gridDim, blockDim>>>(texObj, d_data, height, width);

    // Clean up
    cudaDestroyTextureObject(texObj);
    // cudaFreeArray(cu_array); // when you are done with the array
}

__global__ void kernel(cudaTextureObject_t texObj,
                       float* odata, int height, int width)
{
    int x = blockIdx.x * blockDim.x + threadIdx.x;
    int y = blockIdx.y * blockDim.y + threadIdx.y;

    if (x < width && y < height)
    {
        float c = tex2D<float>(texObj, x, y);
        odata[y * width + x] = c;
    }
}

Below is an example given in Python that computes the product of two arrays on the GPU. The unofficial Python language bindings can be obtained from PyCUDA.

import numpy
import pycuda.autoinit

from numpy.typing import NDArray, float32
from pycuda.compiler import SourceModule
from pycuda.driver import Function, In, Out

mod: SourceModule = SourceModule(
    """
__global__ void multiply_them(float* dest, float* a, float* b) {
    const int i = threadIdx.x;
    dest[i] = a[i] * b[i];
}
"""
)

multiply_them: Function = mod.get_function("multiply_them")

a: NDArray[float32] = numpy.random.randn(400).astype(numpy.float32)
b: NDArray[float32] = numpy.random.randn(400).astype(numpy.float32)

dest: NDArray[float32] = numpy.zeros_like(a)
multiply_them(Out(dest), In(a), In(b), block=(400, 1, 1))

print(dest - a * b)

Additional Python bindings to simplify matrix multiplication operations can be found in the program pycublas.

 
import numpy

from pycublas import CUBLASMatrix

A: CUBLASMatrix = CUBLASMatrix(numpy.mat([[1, 2, 3], [4, 5, 6]], numpy.float32))
B: CUBLASMatrix = CUBLASMatrix(numpy.mat([[2, 3], [4, 5], [6, 7]], numpy.float32))
C: CUBLASMatrix = A * B
print(C.np_mat())

while CuPy directly replaces NumPy:

import cupy

from cupy.typing import NDArray, float64

a: NDArray[float64] = cupy.random.randn(400)
b: NDArray[float64] = cupy.random.randn(400)

dest: NDArray[float64] = cupy.zeros_like(a)

print(dest - a * b)

== GPUs supported ==
Note on notation: compute capability X.Y is also written as SMXY or sm_XY (e.g. 10.3 as SM103 or sm_103) in professional Nvidia software and the code Nvidia has contributed to LLVM.

Below is a table of supported CUDA compute capabilities based on the CUDA SDK version and microarchitecture, listed by code name:

CUDA SDK support vs. microarchitecture (cell: compute capability)
CUDA SDK version(s)	Tesla	Fermi	Kepler (early)	Kepler (late)	Maxwell	Pascal	Volta	Turing	Ampere	Ada Lovelace	Hopper	Blackwell
1.0	1.0 – 1.1											
1.1	1.0 – 1.1+x											
2.0	1.0 – 1.1+x											
2.1 – 2.3.1	1.0 – 1.3											
3.0 – 3.1	1.0	2.0										
3.2	1.0	2.1										
4.0 – 4.2	1.0	2.1										
5.0 – 5.5	1.0		3.0	3.5								
6.0	1.0		3.2	3.5								
6.5	1.1			3.7	5.x							
7.0 – 7.5		2.0			5.x							
8.0		2.0				6.x						
9.0 – 9.2			3.0				7.0 – 7.2					
10.0 – 10.2			3.0					7.5				
11.0				3.5					8.0			
11.1 – 11.4				3.5					8.6			
11.5 – 11.7.1				3.5					8.7			
11.8				3.5						8.9	9.0	
12.0 – 12.6					5.0						9.0	
12.8					5.0							12.0
12.9					5.0							12.1
13.0 – 13.3								7.5				12.1

Note: CUDA SDK 10.2 is the last official release for macOS, as support will not be available for macOS in newer releases.

CUDA compute capability by version with associated GPU semiconductors and GPU card models (separated by their various application areas):

GPU semiconductors and Nvidia GPU board products sorted by compute capability
Compute capability (version)	Micro- architecture	GPUs	GeForce	Quadro, NVS	Tesla/Datacenter	Tegra, Jetson, DRIVE
1.0	Tesla	G80	GeForce 8800 Ultra, GeForce 8800 GTX, GeForce 8800 GTS(G80)	Quadro FX 5600, Quadro FX 4600, Quadro Plex 2100 S4	Tesla C870, Tesla D870, Tesla S870	
1.1	Tesla	G92, G94, G96, G98, G84, G86	GeForce GTS 250, GeForce 9800 GX2, GeForce 9800 GTX, GeForce 9800 GT, GeForce 8800 GTS(G92), GeForce 8800 GT, GeForce 9600 GT, GeForce 9500 GT, GeForce 9400 GT, GeForce 8600 GTS, GeForce 8600 GT, GeForce 8500 GT, GeForce G110M, GeForce 9300M GS, GeForce 9200M GS, GeForce 9100M G, GeForce 8400M GT, GeForce G105M	Quadro FX 4700 X2, Quadro FX 3700, Quadro FX 1800, Quadro FX 1700, Quadro FX 580, Quadro FX 570, Quadro FX 470, Quadro FX 380, Quadro FX 370, Quadro FX 370 Low Profile, Quadro NVS 450, Quadro NVS 420, Quadro NVS 290, Quadro NVS 295, Quadro Plex 2100 D4, Quadro FX 3800M, Quadro FX 3700M, Quadro FX 3600M, Quadro FX 2800M, Quadro FX 2700M, Quadro FX 1700M, Quadro FX 1600M, Quadro FX 770M, Quadro FX 570M, Quadro FX 370M, Quadro FX 360M, Quadro NVS 320M, Quadro NVS 160M, Quadro NVS 150M, Quadro NVS 140M, Quadro NVS 135M, Quadro NVS 130M, Quadro NVS 450, Quadro NVS 420, Quadro NVS 295		
1.2	Tesla	GT218, GT216, GT215	GeForce GT 340*, GeForce GT 330*, GeForce GT 320*, GeForce 315*, GeForce 310*, GeForce GT 240, GeForce GT 220, GeForce 210, GeForce GTS 360M, GeForce GTS 350M, GeForce GT 335M, GeForce GT 330M, GeForce GT 325M, GeForce GT 240M, GeForce G210M, GeForce 310M, GeForce 305M	Quadro FX 380 Low Profile, Quadro FX 1800M, Quadro FX 880M, Quadro FX 380M, Nvidia NVS 300, NVS 5100M, NVS 3100M, NVS 2100M, ION		
1.3	Tesla	GT200, GT200b	GeForce GTX 295, GTX 285, GTX 280, GeForce GTX 275, GeForce GTX 260	Quadro FX 5800, Quadro FX 4800, Quadro FX 4800 for Mac, Quadro FX 3800, Quadro CX, Quadro Plex 2200 D2	Tesla C1060, Tesla S1070, Tesla M1060	
2.0	Fermi	GF100, GF110	GeForce GTX 590, GeForce GTX 580, GeForce GTX 570, GeForce GTX 480, GeForce GTX 470, GeForce GTX 465, GeForce GTX 480M	Quadro 6000, Quadro 5000, Quadro 4000, Quadro 4000 for Mac, Quadro Plex 7000, Quadro 5010M, Quadro 5000M	Tesla C2075, Tesla C2050/C2070, Tesla M2050/M2070/M2075/M2090	
2.1	Fermi	GF104, GF106 GF108, GF114, GF116, GF117, GF119	GeForce GTX 560 Ti, GeForce GTX 550 Ti, GeForce GTX 460, GeForce GTS 450, GeForce GTS 450*, GeForce GT 640 (GDDR3), GeForce GT 630, GeForce GT 620, GeForce GT 610, GeForce GT 520, GeForce GT 440, GeForce GT 440*, GeForce GT 430, GeForce GT 430*, GeForce GT 420*, GeForce GTX 675M, GeForce GTX 670M, GeForce GT 635M, GeForce GT 630M, GeForce GT 625M, GeForce GT 720M, GeForce GT 620M, GeForce 710M, GeForce 610M, GeForce 820M, GeForce GTX 580M, GeForce GTX 570M, GeForce GTX 560M, GeForce GT 555M, GeForce GT 550M, GeForce GT 540M, GeForce GT 525M, GeForce GT 520MX, GeForce GT 520M, GeForce GTX 485M, GeForce GTX 470M, GeForce GTX 460M, GeForce GT 445M, GeForce GT 435M, GeForce GT 420M, GeForce GT 415M, GeForce 710M, GeForce 410M	Quadro 2000, Quadro 2000D, Quadro 600, Quadro 4000M, Quadro 3000M, Quadro 2000M, Quadro 1000M, NVS 310, NVS 315, NVS 5400M, NVS 5200M, NVS 4200M		
3.0	Kepler	GK104, GK106, GK107	GeForce GTX 770, GeForce GTX 760, GeForce GT 740, GeForce GTX 690, GeForce GTX 680, GeForce GTX 670, GeForce GTX 660 Ti, GeForce GTX 660, GeForce GTX 650 Ti BOOST, GeForce GTX 650 Ti, GeForce GTX 650, GeForce GTX 880M, GeForce GTX 870M, GeForce GTX 780M, GeForce GTX 770M, GeForce GTX 765M, GeForce GTX 760M, GeForce GTX 680MX, GeForce GTX 680M, GeForce GTX 675MX, GeForce GTX 670MX, GeForce GTX 660M, GeForce GT 750M, GeForce GT 650M, GeForce GT 745M, GeForce GT 645M, GeForce GT 740M, GeForce GT 730M, GeForce GT 640M, GeForce GT 640M LE, GeForce GT 735M, GeForce GT 730M	Quadro K5000, Quadro K4200, Quadro K4000, Quadro K2000, Quadro K2000D, Quadro K600, Quadro K420, Quadro K500M, Quadro K510M, Quadro K610M, Quadro K1000M, Quadro K2000M, Quadro K1100M, Quadro K2100M, Quadro K3000M, Quadro K3100M, Quadro K4000M, Quadro K5000M, Quadro K4100M, Quadro K5100M, NVS 510, Quadro 410	Tesla K10, GRID K340, GRID K520, GRID K2	
3.2	Kepler	GK20A				Tegra K1, Jetson TK1
3.5	Kepler	GK110, GK208	GeForce GTX Titan Z, GeForce GTX Titan Black, GeForce GTX Titan, GeForce GTX 780 Ti, GeForce GTX 780, GeForce GT 640 (GDDR5), GeForce GT 630 v2, GeForce GT 730, GeForce GT 720, GeForce GT 710, GeForce GT 740M (64-bit, DDR3), GeForce GT 920M	Quadro K6000, Quadro K5200	Tesla K40, Tesla K20x, Tesla K20	
3.7	Kepler	GK210			Tesla K80	
5.0	Maxwell	GM107, GM108	GeForce GTX 750 Ti, GeForce GTX 750, GeForce GTX 960M, GeForce GTX 950M, GeForce 940M, GeForce 930M, GeForce GTX 860M, GeForce GTX 850M, GeForce 845M, GeForce 840M, GeForce 830M	Quadro K1200, Quadro K2200, Quadro K620, Quadro M2000M, Quadro M1000M, Quadro M600M, Quadro K620M, NVS 810	Tesla M10	
5.2	Maxwell	GM200, GM204, GM206	GeForce GTX Titan X, GeForce GTX 980 Ti, GeForce GTX 980, GeForce GTX 970, GeForce GTX 960, GeForce GTX 950, GeForce GTX 750 SE, GeForce GTX 980M, GeForce GTX 970M, GeForce GTX 965M	Quadro M6000 24GB, Quadro M6000, Quadro M5000, Quadro M4000, Quadro M2000, Quadro M5500, Quadro M5000M, Quadro M4000M, Quadro M3000M	Tesla M4, Tesla M40, Tesla M6, Tesla M60	
5.3	Maxwell	GM20B				Tegra X1, Jetson TX1, Jetson Nano, DRIVE CX, DRIVE PX
6.0	Pascal	GP100		Quadro GP100	Tesla P100	
6.1	Pascal	GP102, GP104, GP106, GP107, GP108	Nvidia TITAN Xp, Titan X, GeForce GTX 1080 Ti, GTX 1080, GTX 1070 Ti, GTX 1070, GTX 1060, GTX 1050 Ti, GTX 1050, GT 1030, GT 1010, MX350, MX330, MX250, MX230, MX150, MX130, MX110	Quadro P6000, Quadro P5000, Quadro P4000, Quadro P2200, Quadro P2000, Quadro P1000, Quadro P400, Quadro P500, Quadro P520, Quadro P600, Quadro P5000 (mobile), Quadro P4000 (mobile), Quadro P3000 (mobile)	Tesla P40, Tesla P6, Tesla P4	
6.2	Pascal	GP10B				Tegra X2, Jetson TX2, DRIVE PX 2
7.0	Volta	GV100	NVIDIA TITAN V	Quadro GV100	Tesla V100, Tesla V100S	
7.2	Volta	GV10B GV11B				Tegra Xavier, Jetson Xavier NX, Jetson AGX Xavier, DRIVE AGX Xavier, DRIVE AGX Pegasus, Clara AGX
7.5	Turing	TU102, TU104, TU106, TU116, TU117	NVIDIA TITAN RTX, GeForce RTX 2080 Ti, RTX 2080 Super, RTX 2080, RTX 2070 Super, RTX 2070, RTX 2060 Super, RTX 2060 12GB, RTX 2060, GeForce GTX 1660 Ti, GTX 1660 Super, GTX 1660, GTX 1650 Super, GTX 1650, MX550, MX450	Quadro RTX 8000, Quadro RTX 6000, Quadro RTX 5000, Quadro RTX 4000, T1000, T600, T400; T1200 (mobile), T600 (mobile), T500 (mobile), Quadro T2000 (mobile), Quadro T1000 (mobile)	Tesla T4	
8.0	Ampere	GA100			A100 80GB, A100 40GB, A30	
8.6	Ampere	GA102, GA103, GA104, GA106, GA107	GeForce RTX 3090 Ti, RTX 3090, RTX 3080 Ti, RTX 3080 12GB, RTX 3080, RTX 3070 Ti, RTX 3070, RTX 3060 Ti, RTX 3060, RTX 3050, RTX 3050 Ti (mobile), RTX 3050 (mobile), RTX 2050 (mobile), MX570	RTX A6000, RTX A5500, RTX A5000, RTX A4500, RTX A4000, RTX A2000; RTX A5000 (mobile), RTX A4000 (mobile), RTX A3000 (mobile), RTX A2000 (mobile)	A40, A16, A10, A2	
8.7	Ampere	GA10B				Jetson Orin Nano, Jetson Orin NX, Jetson AGX Orin, DRIVE AGX Orin, IGX Orin
8.9	Ada Lovelace	AD102, AD103, AD104, AD106, AD107	GeForce RTX 4090, RTX 4080 Super, RTX 4080, RTX 4070 Ti Super, RTX 4070 Ti, RTX 4070 Super, RTX 4070, RTX 4060 Ti, RTX 4060, RTX 4050 (mobile)	RTX 6000 Ada, RTX 5880 Ada, RTX 5000 Ada, RTX 4500 Ada, RTX 4000 Ada, RTX 4000 SFF Ada, RTX 2000 Ada, RTX 5000 Ada (mobile), RTX 4000 Ada (mobile), RTX 3500 Ada (mobile), RTX 2000 Ada (mobile)	L40S, L40, L20, L4, L2	
9.0	Hopper	GH100			H200, H100, GH200	
10.0	Blackwell	GB100			B200, B100, GB200	
10.3	Blackwell	GB110		DGX Station	B300, GB300	
11.0 (Note: CUDA Toolkit 13.0 renamed the SM101 for Thor GPUs to SM110.)	Blackwell	GB10B				Jetson AGX Thor, DRIVE AGX Thor, IGX Thor
12.0	Blackwell	GB202, GB203, GB205, GB206, GB207	GeForce RTX 5090, RTX 5080, RTX 5070 Ti, RTX 5070, RTX 5060 Ti, RTX 5060, RTX 5050	RTX PRO 6000 Blackwell Workstation, RTX PRO 5500 Blackwell Workstation, RTX PRO 5000 Blackwell, RTX PRO 4500 Blackwell Workstation, RTX PRO 4000 Blackwell, RTX PRO 2000 Blackwell	RTX PRO 6000 Blackwell Server, RTX PRO 4500 Blackwell Server	
12.1	Blackwell	GB20B	RTX Spark	DGX Spark		
Compute capability (version)	Micro- architecture	GPUs	GeForce	Quadro, NVS	Tesla/Datacenter	Tegra, Jetson, DRIVE

* – OEM-only products

== Version features and specifications ==
Note: A GPU with a higher compute capacity is able to execute PTX code meant for a GPU of a lower range of compute capacities. However, it is possible to compile CUDA code into a form that only works on one family (same "X") of GPUs; if existing code is compiled this way, recompilation will be needed for it to work on a newer GPU.

Feature support (unlisted features are supported for all compute capabilities)	Compute capability (version)								
Feature support (unlisted features are supported for all compute capabilities)	1.0, 1.1	1.2, 1.3	2.x	3.0	3.2	3.5, 3.7, 5.x, 6.x, 7.0, 7.2	7.5	8.x	9.0, 10.x, 12.x
Warp vote functions (__all(), __any())	No	Yes							
Warp vote functions (__ballot())	No		Yes						
Memory fence functions (__threadfence_system())	No		Yes						
Synchronization functions (__syncthreads_count(), __syncthreads_and(), __syncthreads_or())	No		Yes						
Surface functions	No		Yes						
3D grid of thread blocks	No		Yes						
Warp shuffle functions	No			Yes					
Unified memory programming	No			Yes					
Funnel shift	No				Yes				
Dynamic parallelism	No					Yes			
Uniform Datapath	No						Yes		
Hardware-accelerated async-copy	No							Yes	
Hardware-accelerated split arrive/wait barrier	No							Yes	
Warp-level support for reduction ops	No							Yes	
L2 cache residency management	No							Yes	
DPX instructions for accelerated dynamic programming	No								Yes
Distributed shared memory	No								Yes
Thread block cluster	No								Yes
Tensor memory accelerator (TMA) unit	No								Yes
Feature support (unlisted features are supported for all compute capabilities)	1.0, 1.1	1.2, 1.3	2.x	3.0	3.2	3.5, 3.7, 5.x, 6.x, 7.0, 7.2	7.5	8.x	9.0, 10.x, 12.x
Feature support (unlisted features are supported for all compute capabilities)	Compute capability (version)								

=== Data types ===
==== Floating-point types ====
Data type	Supported vector types	Bits					Comments
Data type	Supported vector types	Storage Length (complete vector)	Used Length (single value)	Sign	Exponent	Mantissa	Comments
E2M1 = FP4	e2m1x2 / e2m1x4	8 / 16	4	1	2	1	
E2M3 = FP6 variant	e2m3x2 / e2m3x4	16 / 32	6	1	2	3	
E3M2 = FP6 variant	e3m2x2 / e3m2x4	16 / 32	6	1	3	2	
UE4M3	ue4m3	8	7	0	4	3	Used for scaling (E2M1 only)
E4M3 = FP8 variant	e4m3 / e4m3x2 / e4m3x4	8 / 16 / 32	8	1	4	3	
E5M2 = FP8 variant	e5m2 / e5m2x2 / e5m2x4	8 / 16 / 32	8	1	5	2	Exponent/range of FP16, fits into 8 bits
UE8M0	ue8m0x2	16	8	0	8	0	Used for scaling (any FP4 or FP6 or FP8 format)
FP16	f16 / f16x2	16 / 32	16	1	5	10	
BF16	bf16 / bf16x2	16 / 32	16	1	8	7	Exponent/range of FP32, fits into 16 bits
TF32	tf32	32	19	1	8	10	Exponent/range of FP32, mantissa/precision of FP16
FP32	f32 / f32x2	32 / 64	32	1	8	23	
FP64	f64	64	64	1	11	52	

==== Version support ====
Data type	Basic Operations	Supported since	Atomic Operations	Supported since for global memory	Supported since for shared memory
8-bit integer signed/unsigned	loading, storing, conversion	1.0	—N/a	—N/a	
16-bit integer signed/unsigned	general operations	1.0	atomicCAS()	3.5	
32-bit integer signed/unsigned	general operations	1.0	atomic functions	1.1	1.2
64-bit integer signed/unsigned	general operations	1.0	atomic functions	1.2	2.0
any 128-bit trivially copyable type	general operations	No	atomicExch, atomicCAS	9.0	
16-bit floating point FP16	addition, subtraction, multiplication, comparison, warp shuffle functions, conversion	5.3	half2 atomic addition	6.0	
16-bit floating point FP16	addition, subtraction, multiplication, comparison, warp shuffle functions, conversion	5.3	atomic addition	7.0	
16-bit floating point BF16	addition, subtraction, multiplication, comparison, warp shuffle functions, conversion	8.0	atomic addition	8.0	
32-bit floating point	general operations	1.0	atomicExch()	1.1	1.2
32-bit floating point	general operations	1.0	atomic addition	2.0	
32-bit floating point float2 and float4	general operations	No	atomic addition	9.0	
64-bit floating point	general operations	1.3	atomic addition	6.0	

Note: Any missing lines or empty entries do reflect some lack of information on that exact item.

=== Tensor cores ===
FMA per cycle per tensor core	Supported since		7.0	7.2	7.5 Workstation	7.5 Desktop	8.0	8.6 Workstation	8.7	8.6 Desktop	8.9 Desktop	8.9 Workstation	9.0	10.0	10.1	12.0
Data Type	For dense matrices	For sparse matrices	1st Gen (8x/SM)	1st Gen? (8x/SM)	2nd Gen (8x/SM)		3rd Gen (4x/SM)				4th Gen (4x/SM)			5th Gen (4x/SM)		
1-bit values (AND)	8.0 as experimental	No	No				4096			2048			8192	No		
1-bit values (XOR)	7.5–8.9 as experimental	No	No		1024		4096			2048			No	No		
4-bit integers	7.5–8.9 as experimental	8.0–8.9 as experimental	No		256		1024			512			legacy mma.sync	No		
4-bit floating point FP4 (E2M1)	10.0		No											4096	tbd	512
6-bit floating point FP6 (E3M2 and E2M3)	10.0		No											2048	tbd	tbd
8-bit integers	7.2	8.0	No	128	128		512			256			1024	2048	tbd	256
8-bit floating point FP8 (E4M3 and E5M2) with FP16 accumulate	8.9		No								256		1024	2048	tbd	256
8-bit floating point FP8 (E4M3 and E5M2) with FP32 accumulate	8.9		No								128		1024	2048	tbd	128
16-bit floating point FP16 with FP16 accumulate	7.0	8.0	64		64	64	256			128			512	1024	tbd	128
16-bit floating point FP16 with FP32 accumulate	7.0	8.0	64		64	32	256			64		128	512	1024	tbd	64
16-bit floating point BF16 with FP32 accumulate	7.5	8.0	No		64	32	256			64		128	512	1024	tbd	64
32-bit (19 bits used) floating point TF32	7.5	8.0	No		speed tbd (32?)	32	128			32		64	256	512	tbd	32
64-bit floating point	8.0	No	No		No		16	speed tbd					32	16	tbd	tbd

Note: Any missing lines or empty entries do reflect some lack of information on that exact item.

Tensor Core Composition	7.0	7.2, 7.5	8.0, 8.6	8.7	8.9	9.0
Dot Product Unit Width in FP16 units (in bytes)	4 (8)		8 (16)	4 (8)		16 (32)
Dot Product Units per Tensor Core	16		32			
Tensor Cores per SM partition	2		1			
Full throughput (Bytes/cycle) per SM partition	256		512	256		1024
FP Tensor Cores: Minimum cycles for warp-wide matrix calculation	8		4	8		
FP Tensor Cores: Minimum Matrix Shape for full throughput (Bytes)	2048					
INT Tensor Cores: Minimum cycles for warp-wide matrix calculation	No	4				
INT Tensor Cores: Minimum Matrix Shape for full throughput (Bytes)	No	1024	2048	1024		

FP64 Tensor Core Composition	8.0	8.6	8.7	8.9	9.0
Dot Product Unit Width in FP64 units (in bytes)	4 (32)	tbd			4 (32)
Dot Product Units per Tensor Core	4	tbd			8
Tensor Cores per SM partition	1				
Full throughput (Bytes/cycle) per SM partition	128	tbd			256
Minimum cycles for warp-wide matrix calculation	16	tbd			
Minimum Matrix Shape for full throughput (Bytes)	2048				

=== Technical specifications ===
Technical specifications	Compute capability (version)																								
Technical specifications	1.0	1.1	1.2	1.3	2.x	3.0	3.2	3.5	3.7	5.0	5.2	5.3	6.0	6.1	6.2	7.0	7.2	7.5	8.0	8.6	8.7	8.9	9.0	10.x	12.x
Maximum number of resident grids per device (concurrent kernel execution, can be lower for specific devices)	1				16		4	32				16	128	32	16	128	16	128							
Maximum dimensionality of grid of thread blocks	2				3																				
Maximum x-dimension of a grid of thread blocks	65535					2^{31} − 1																			
Maximum y-, or z-dimension of a grid of thread blocks	65535																								
Maximum dimensionality of thread block	3																								
Maximum x- or y-dimension of a block	512				1024																				
Maximum z-dimension of a block	64																								
Maximum number of threads per block	512				1024																				
Warp size	32																								
Maximum number of resident blocks per multiprocessor	8					16				32								16	32	16		24	32		
Maximum number of resident warps per multiprocessor	24		32		48	64												32	64	48			64		48
Maximum number of resident threads per multiprocessor	768		1024		1536	2048												1024	2048	1536			2048		1536
Number of 32-bit regular registers per multiprocessor	8 K		16 K		32 K	64 K			128 K	64 K															
Number of 32-bit uniform registers per multiprocessor	No																	2 K							
Maximum number of 32-bit registers per thread block	8 K		16 K		32 K	64 K	32 K	64 K				32 K	64 K		32 K	64 K									
Maximum number of 32-bit regular registers per thread	124				63		255																		
Maximum number of 32-bit uniform registers per warp	No																	63							
Amount of shared memory per multiprocessor (out of overall shared memory + L1 cache, where applicable)	16 KiB				16 / 48 KiB (of 64 KiB)	16 / 32 / 48 KiB (of 64 KiB)			80 / 96 / 112 KiB (of 128 KiB)	64 KiB	96 KiB	64 KiB		96 KiB	64 KiB	0 / 8 / 16 / 32 / 64 / 96 KiB (of 128 KiB)		32 / 64 KiB (of 96 KiB)	0 / 8 / 16 / 32 / 64 / 100 / 132 / 164 KiB (of 192 KiB)	0 / 8 / 16 / 32 / 64 / 100 KiB (of 128 KiB)	0 / 8 / 16 / 32 / 64 / 100 / 132 / 164 KiB (of 192 KiB)	0 / 8 / 16 / 32 / 64 / 100 KiB (of 128 KiB)	0 / 8 / 16 / 32 / 64 / 100 / 132 / 164 / 196 / 228 KiB (of 256 KiB)		0 / 8 / 16 / 32 / 64 / 100 KiB (of 128 KiB)
Maximum amount of shared memory per thread block	16 KiB				48 KiB											96 KiB	48 KiB	64 KiB	163 KiB	99 KiB	163 KiB	99 KiB	227 KiB		99 KiB
Number of shared memory banks	16				32																				
Amount of local memory per thread	16 KiB				512 KiB																				
Constant memory size accessible by CUDA C/C++ (1 bank, PTX can access 11 banks, SASS can access 18 banks)	64 KiB																								
Cache working set per multiprocessor for constant memory	8 KiB												4 KiB	8 KiB											
Cache working set per multiprocessor for texture memory	16 KiB per TPC			24 KiB per TPC	12 KiB	12 – 48 KiB				24 KiB	48 KiB	32 KiB	24 KiB	48 KiB	24 KiB	32 – 128 KiB		32 – 64 KiB	28 – 192 KiB	28 – 128 KiB	28 – 192 KiB	28 – 128 KiB	28 – 256 KiB		
Maximum width for 1D texture reference bound to a CUDA array	8192				65536								131072												
Maximum width for 1D texture reference bound to linear memory	2^{27}												2^{28}	2^{27}		2^{28}	2^{27}	2^{28}							
Maximum width and number of layers for a 1D layered texture reference	8192 × 512				16384 × 2048								32768 x 2048												
Maximum width and height for 2D texture reference bound to a CUDA array	65536 × 32768				65536 × 65535								131072 x 65536												
Maximum width and height for 2D texture reference bound to a linear memory	65000 x 65000									65536 x 65536			131072 x 65000												
Maximum width and height for 2D texture reference bound to a CUDA array supporting texture gather	—N/a				16384 x 16384								32768 x 32768												
Maximum width, height, and number of layers for a 2D layered texture reference	8192 × 8192 × 512				16384 × 16384 × 2048								32768 x 32768 x 2048												
Maximum width, height and depth for a 3D texture reference bound to linear memory or a CUDA array	2048^{3}					4096^{3}							16384^{3}												
Maximum width (and height) for a cubemap texture reference	—N/a				16384								32768												
Maximum width (and height) and number of layers for a cubemap layered texture reference	—N/a				16384 × 2046								32768 × 2046												
Maximum number of textures that can be bound to a kernel	128					256																			
Maximum width for a 1D surface reference bound to a CUDA array	Not supported				65536					16384			32768												
Maximum width and number of layers for a 1D layered surface reference	Not supported				65536 × 2048					16384 × 2048			32768 × 2048												
Maximum width and height for a 2D surface reference bound to a CUDA array	Not supported				65536 × 32768					16384 × 65536			131072 × 65536												
Maximum width, height, and number of layers for a 2D layered surface reference	Not supported				65536 × 32768 × 2048					16384 × 16384 × 2048			32768 × 32768 × 2048												
Maximum width, height, and depth for a 3D surface reference bound to a CUDA array	Not supported				65536 × 32768 × 2048					4096 × 4096 × 4096			16384 × 16384 × 16384												
Maximum width (and height) for a cubemap surface reference bound to a CUDA array	Not supported				32768					16384			32768												
Maximum width and number of layers for a cubemap layered surface reference	Not supported				32768 × 2046					16384 × 2046			32768 × 2046												
Maximum number of surfaces that can be bound to a kernel	Not supported				8	16										32									
Maximum number of instructions per kernel	2 million				512 million																				
Maximum number of Thread Blocks per Thread Block Cluster	No																						16		8
Technical specifications	1.0	1.1	1.2	1.3	2.x	3.0	3.2	3.5	3.7	5.0	5.2	5.3	6.0	6.1	6.2	7.0	7.2	7.5	8.0	8.6	8.7	8.9	9.0	10.x	12.x
Technical specifications	Compute capability (version)																								

=== Multiprocessor architecture ===
Architecture specifications	Compute capability (version)																									
Architecture specifications	1.0	1.1	1.2	1.3	2.0	2.1	3.0	3.2	3.5	3.7	5.0	5.2	5.3	6.0	6.1	6.2	7.0	7.2	7.5	8.0	8.6	8.7	8.9	9.0	10.x	12.x
Number of ALU lanes for INT32 arithmetic operations	8				32	48	192				128		128	64	128	128	64				64		64		128	
Number of ALU lanes for any INT32 or FP32 arithmetic operation	8				32	48	192				128		128	64	128	128	—N/a				64		—N/a		128	
Number of ALU lanes for FP32 arithmetic operations	8				32	48	192				128		128	64	128	128	64			64			128	128	128	
Number of ALU lanes for FP16x2 arithmetic operations	No												128	64	1	128	64			128	128		64	128	128	
Number of ALU lanes for FP64 arithmetic operations	No			1	16 by FP32	4 by FP32	8		8 / 64	64	4			32	4		32		2	32	2			64		2
Number of Load/Store Units	4 per 2 SM	8 per 2 SM	8 per 2 SM / 3 SM	8 per 3 SM	16		32							16	32					16				32		
Number of special function units for single-precision floating-point transcendental functions	2				4	8	32						16		32		16									
Number of texture mapping units (TMU)	4 per 2 SM	8 per 2 SM	8 per 2 / 3SM	8 per 3 SM	4	4 / 8	16	8	16		8						4									
Number of ALU lanes for uniform INT32 arithmetic operations	No																		2							
Number of tensor cores	No																8 (1st gen.)		0 / 8 (2nd gen.)	4 (3rd gen.)			4 (4th gen.)			
Number of raytracing cores	No																		0 / 1 (1st gen.)	No	1 (2nd gen.)	No	1 (3rd gen.)	No		
Number of SM Partitions = Processing Blocks	1										4			2	4											
Number of warp schedulers per SM partition	1				2		4				1															
Max number of new instructions issued each cycle by a single scheduler	2				1	2	2										1									
Size of unified memory for data cache and shared memory	16 KiB			16 KiB	64 KiB					128 KiB	64 KiB SM + 24 KiB L1 (separate)	96 KiB SM + 24 KiB L1 (separate)	64 KiB SM + 24 KiB L1 (separate)	64 KiB SM + 24 KiB L1 (separate)	96 KiB SM + 24 KiB L1 (separate)	64 KiB SM + 24 KiB L1 (separate)	128 KiB		96 KiB	192 KiB	128 KiB	192 KiB	128 KiB	256 KiB		
Size of L3 instruction cache per GPU				32 KiB			use L2 Data Cache																			
Size of L2 instruction cache per Texture Processor Cluster (TPC)				8 KiB			use L2 Data Cache																			
Size of L1.5 instruction cache per SM				4 KiB						32 KiB		32 KiB	48 KiB	128 KiB	32 KiB		128 KiB		~46 KiB	128 KiB						
Size of L1 instruction cache per SM				4 KiB						8 KiB				8 KiB			128 KiB		~46 KiB	128 KiB						
Size of L0 instruction cache per SM partition	only 1 partition per SM										No						12 KiB		16 KiB?	32 KiB						
Instruction Width	32 bits instructions and 64 bits instructions						64 bits instructions + 64 bits control logic every 7 instructions				64 bits instructions + 64 bits control logic every 3 instructions						128 bits combined instruction and control logic									
Memory Bus Width per Memory Controller in bits	64 ((G)DDR)												32 ((G)DDR)	512 (HBM)	32 ((G)DDR)		512 (HBM)	32 ((G)DDR)		512 (HBM)	32 ((G)DDR)			512 (HBM)		32 ((G)DDR)
L2 Cache per Memory Controller	16 KiB			32 KiB	128 KiB				256 KiB		1 MiB	512 KiB	128 KiB	512 KiB	256 KiB	128 KiB	768 KiB	64 KiB	512 KiB	4 MiB	512 KiB		8 MiB	5 MiB	6.25 MiB	8 MiB
Number of Render Output Units (ROP) per memory controller (or per GPC in later models)	4				8			4	8			16	8	12	8	4	16	2	8	16	16 per GPC	3 per GPC	16 per GPC			
Architecture specifications	1.0	1.1	1.2	1.3	2.0	2.1	3.0	3.2	3.5	3.7	5.0	5.2	5.3	6.0	6.1	6.2	7.0	7.2	7.5	8.0	8.6	8.7	8.9	9.0	10.x	12.x
Architecture specifications	Compute capability (version)																									

For more information, read the Nvidia CUDA C++ Programming Guide.

== Usages ==
- Accelerated rendering of 3D graphics
- Accelerated interconversion of video file formats
- Accelerated encryption, decryption and compression
- Bioinformatics, e.g. NGS DNA sequencing BarraCUDA
- Distributed calculations, such as predicting the native conformation of proteins
- Medical analysis simulations, for example virtual reality based on CT and MRI scan images
- Physical simulations, particularly in fluid dynamics
- Neural network training in machine learning problems
- Large language model inference
- Face recognition
- Volunteer computing projects, such as SETI@home and other projects using BOINC software
- Molecular dynamics
- Mining cryptocurrencies
- Structure from motion (SfM) software

== Comparison with competitors ==
CUDA competes with other GPU computing stacks: Intel OneAPI and AMD ROCm.

Whereas Nvidia's CUDA is closed-source, Intel's OneAPI and AMD's ROCm are open source.

=== Intel OneAPI ===
oneAPI is an initiative based in open standards, created to support software development for multiple hardware architectures. The oneAPI libraries must implement open specifications that are discussed publicly by the Special Interest Groups, offering the possibility for any developer or organization to implement their own versions of oneAPI libraries.

Originally made by Intel, other hardware adopters include Fujitsu and Huawei.

==== Unified Acceleration Foundation (UXL) ====
Unified Acceleration Foundation (UXL) is a new technology consortium working on the continuation of the OneAPI initiative, with the goal to create a new open standard accelerator software ecosystem, related open standards and specification projects through Working Groups and Special Interest Groups (SIGs). The goal is to offer open alternatives to Nvidia's CUDA. The main companies behind it are Intel, Google, ARM, Qualcomm, Samsung, Imagination, and VMware.

=== AMD ROCm ===
ROCm is an open source software stack for graphics processing unit (GPU) programming from Advanced Micro Devices (AMD).

== See also ==
- Array programming
- BrookGPU – the Stanford University graphics group's compiler
- CUDA binary (cubin) – a type of fat binary
- Molecular modeling on GPUs
- Numerical Library Collection – by NEC for their vector processor
- OptiX – ray tracing API by NVIDIA
- Parallel computing
- rCUDA – an API for computing on remote computers
- Stream processing
- SYCL – an open standard from Khronos Group for programming a variety of platforms, including GPUs, with single-source modern C++, similar to higher-level CUDA Runtime API (single-source)
- Vulkan – low-level, high-performance 3D graphics and computing API
