= Esper (software) =

Esper_(software)
- Developer: EsperTech Inc.
- Stable release: check website
- Repository: github.com/espertechinc/esper
- Written in: Java, C#
- Operating system: Cross-platform
- Type: Complex Event Processing
- License: GPL v2
- Website: www.espertech.com/esper

Esper is an open-source Java-based software product for complex event processing (CEP) and event stream processing (ESP), that analyzes series of events for deriving conclusions from them.

Esper extends the SQL-92 standard for its engine and enterprise framework, providing Aggregate function, Pattern matching, event windowing and joining. Esper implements Event-driven programming and event-driven architecture.

Esper was created in 2006 by EsperTech Inc. It offers a Domain-specific language for processing events called Event Processing Language (EPL). EPL is a Declarative programming language for analyzing time-based event data and detecting situations as they occur.

Esper is a Java-based application but has been ported to the C# programming language and is available for the .NET Framework under the name NEsper.

== Example ==
This example illustrates a simple EPL query that outputs a row immediately when within a sliding window of 3 minutes the number of order events reaches 5 or more events.

select count(*) from OrderEvent#time(3 min) having count(*) >= 5

== Related systems ==
- Rapide (Stanford)
- StreamSQL: StreamSQL is a query language that extends SQL with the ability to process real-time data streams.

== See also ==
- Complex event processing (CEP) - A related technology for building and managing event-driven information systems.
- Data Stream Management System (DSMS) - A type of software system for managing and querying data streams
- Event correlation
- Event-driven architecture — (EDA) is a software architecture pattern promoting the production, detection, consumption of, and reaction to events.
- Event stream processing — (ESP) is a related technology that focuses on processing streams of related data.
- Operational intelligence — Both CEP and ESP are technologies that underpin operational intelligence.
- Pattern matching
- Real-time business intelligence — Business Intelligence is the application of knowledge derived from CEP systems
- Real-time computing — CEP systems are typically real-time systems
- Real time enterprise
