= Widom =

Widom may refer to:

- Benjamin Widom (1927–2025), American physical chemist
- Harold Widom (1932–2021), American mathematician, brother of Benjamin
- Jennifer Widom, computer scientist
- Todd Widom (born 1983), tennis player

== See also ==
- Tracy–Widom distribution, in statistics
- Widom insertion method, in thermodynamics
- Widom scaling, hypothesis in statistical mechanics
