= Event data =

Event data may refer to:

- Events within an Event-driven architecture
- Events handled by Event stream processing
- Events handled by Complex event processing
- Records within an Audit trail
