= AIOps =

Artificial intelligence in IT operations

AIOps (Artificial Intelligence for IT Operations) is the use of artificial intelligence, machine learning, and big data analytics to automate and enhance data center management. It helps organizations manage complex IT environments by detecting, diagnosing, and resolving issues more efficiently than traditional methods.

== History ==
AIOps was first defined by Gartner in 2016, combining "artificial intelligence" and "IT operations" to describe the application of AI and machine learning to enhance IT operations. This concept was introduced to address the increasing complexity and data volume in IT environments, aiming to automate processes such as event correlation, anomaly detection, and causality determination.

== Definition ==
AIOps refers to multi-layered, complex technology platforms that enhance and automate IT operations by using machine learning and analytics to analyze the large amounts of data collected from various DevOps devices and tools, automatically identifying and responding to issues in real-time. AIOps represents a shift from isolated IT data to aggregated observational data (e.g., job logs and monitoring systems) and interaction data (such as ticketing, events, or incident records) within a big data platform. AIOps applies machine learning and analytics to this data, resulting in continuous visibility that, when combined with automation, can lead to ongoing improvements. AIOps connects three IT disciplines (automation, service management, and performance management) to achieve continuous visibility and improvement. This new approach in modern, accelerated, and hyper-scaled IT environments leverages advances in machine learning and big data to overcome previous limitations.

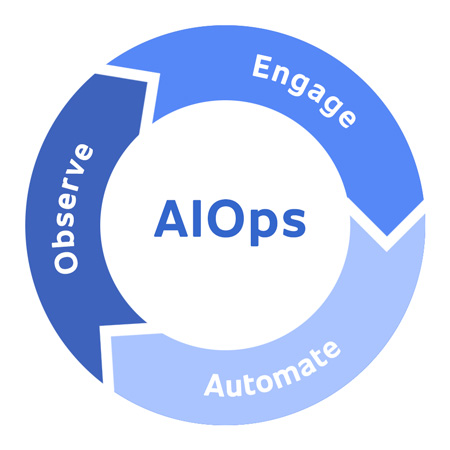
AIOps Diagram

== Components ==
AIOps includes, but is not limited to, the following processes and techniques:

- Anomaly Detection
- Log Analysis
- Root Cause Analysis
- Cohort Analysis
- Event Correlation
- Predictive Analytics
- Hardware Failure Prediction
- Automated Remediation
- Performance Prediction
- Incident Management
- Causality Determination
- Queue Management
- Resource Scheduling and Optimization
- Predictive Capacity Management
- Resource Allocation
- Service Quality Monitoring
- Deployment and Integration Testing
- System Configuration
- Auto-diagnosis and Problem Localization
- Efficient ML Training and Inferencing
- Using LLMs for Cloud Ops
- Auto Service Healing
- Data Center Management
- Customer Support
- Security and Privacy in Cloud Operations

== Comparison with DevOps ==
AIOps is increasingly compared with DevOps in terms of impact on operational efficiency. While DevOps focuses on collaboration between development and operations teams to accelerate software delivery, AIOps integrates artificial intelligence to enhance monitoring, automation, and predictive capabilities. Various industry analyses have explored the similarities and differences between the two approaches, including discussions on how organizations can combine them to improve incident management and resource optimization.

== Results ==
AI optimizes IT operations in five ways: First, intelligent monitoring powered by AI helps identify potential issues before they cause outages, improving metrics like Mean Time to Detect (MTTD) by 15-20%. Second, performance data analysis and insights enable quick decision-making by ingesting and analyzing large data sets in real time. Third, AI-driven automated infrastructure optimization efficiently allocates resources and thereby reducing cloud costs. Fourth, enhanced IT service management reduces critical incidents by over 50% through AI-driven end-to-end service management. Lastly, intelligent task automation accelerates problem resolution and automates remedial actions with minimal human intervention.

== AIOps vs. MLOps ==
AIOps tools use big data analytics, machine learning algorithms, and predictive analytics to detect anomalies, correlate events, and provide proactive insights. This automation reduces the burden on IT teams, allowing them to focus on strategic tasks rather than routine operational issues. AIOps is widely used by IT operations teams, DevOps, network administrators, and IT service management (ITSM) teams to enhance visibility and enable quicker incident resolution in hybrid cloud environments, data centers, and other IT infrastructures.

In contrast to MLOps (Machine Learning Operations), which focuses on the lifecycle management and operational aspects of machine learning models, AIOps focuses on optimizing IT operations using a variety of analytics and AI-driven techniques. While both disciplines rely on AI and data-driven methods, AIOps primarily targets IT operations, whereas MLOps is concerned with the deployment, monitoring, and maintenance of ML models.

== Conferences ==
There are several conferences that are specific to AIOps:

- AIOps Summit
- AI Dev Summit
- IBM Think conference
