= Opher Etzion =

- עֹפר עציון
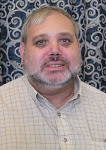
- Born: 28 June 1957 (age 69); Haifa, Israel
- Occupation: Computer scientist
- Known for: Founder of Event Processing Technical Society

Opher Etzion (Hebrew: עֹפר עציון) is an Israeli computer scientist.

He is a Professor and head of the IS Academic Department at the Zefat Academic College.

Etzion has been instrumental in the development of the complex event processing area of computer science.

== Professional background ==
Etzion was the Chief Scientist of Event Processing at the IBM Haifa Research Lab. Previously, he was Lead Architect of Event Processing Technology at IBM Websphere and a Senior Manager at the IBM Research Division, managing a department that has pioneered projects shaping the field of event processing. He is also the founding chair of the Event Processing Technical Society.

Etzion serves as Professor and Academic Adviser to the MIS department of the Yezreel Valley College and adjunct professor at Technion – Israel Institute of Technology. Etzion has supervised several doctoral dissertations and masters theses.

He has authored or co-authored papers in technical journals and conferences on topics related to active databases, temporal databases, Rule-based systems, event processing and Autonomic computing. He has given several keynote address and tutorials and has been named an ACM Distinguished Speaker.

With Peter Niblett, he was the co-author of Event Processing in Action, a comprehensive technical book about event processing. He also co-edited the book Temporal Database - Research and Practice.

Prior to joining IBM in 1997, he was a faculty member and Founding Head of the Information Systems Engineering Department at Technion and held professional and managerial positions at Sapiens International Corporation and in the Israel Air Force.

== Honors and awards ==
- The Israeli Air Force Prize (the highest award for the Air Force), 1982
- IBM Outstanding Innovation Award, 2002 and 2013
- IBM Corporate Award, 2010
- ACM Distinguished Speaker, 2011

== Published works ==
- Etzion, Opher; Adkins, Jeffrey (June 2013). Why is event-driven thinking different from traditional thinking about computing?. Distributed Event-Based Systems. ACM. pp. 269–270.
- Etzion, Opher; Niblett, Peter (2010). Event Processing in Action. Manning Publications Co. ISBN 978-1935182214.
- Adi, Asaf; Etzion, Opher (May 2004). "Amit-the situation manager". The VLDB Journal. 13 (2). Springer-Verlag: 177–203. doi:10.1007/s00778-003-0108-y. S2CID 20462174.
- Sharon, Guy; Etzion, Opher (2008). "Event-processing network model and implementation". IBM Systems Journal. 47 (2). IBM: 321–334. doi:10.1147/sj.472.0321.
- Wasserkrug, Segev; Gal, Avigdor; Etzion, Opher; Turchin, Yulia (July 2008). Complex event processing over uncertain data. Distributed Event-Based Systems. Vol. 47. ACM. pp. 253–264.
- Etzion, Opher; jajodia, Sushil; Sripada, Suryanarayana, eds. (1998). Temporal Databases: Research and Practice. Springer-Verlag.
- Etzion, Opher (1993). "PARDES: a data-driven oriented active database model". ACM SIGMOD Record. 22 (1). ACM: 7–14. doi:10.1145/156883.156884. S2CID 14690912.
- Anussornnitisarn, Pornthep; Nof, Shimon; Etzion, Opher (2005). "Decentralized control of cooperative and autonomous agents for solving the distributed resource allocation problem". International Journal of Production Economics. 98 (2): 114–128. doi:10.1016/j.ijpe.2004.05.015.
- Etzion, Opher; Fisher, Amit; Wasserkrug, Segev (28 March 2004). e-CLV: a modelling approach for customer lifetime evaluation in e-commerce domains, with an application and case study for online auctions. 2004 IEEE International Conference on e-Technology, e-Commerce and e-Service, 2004. IEEE. pp. 149–156.
- Ammon, Rainer; Ertlmaier, Thomas; Etzion, Opher; Kofman, Alexander; Paulus, thomas (2010). "Integrating complex events for collaborating and dynamically changing business processes". Service-Oriented Computing. ICSOC/ServiceWave 2009 Workshops. pp. 370–384.
- Adi, Asaf; Etzion, Opher (2002). "The situation manager rule language". RuleML. 60: 36–57.
- Lakshmanan, Geetika; Rabinovich, Yuri; Etzion, Opher (6 July 2009). A stratified approach for supporting high throughput event processing applications. Third ACM International Conference of Distributed Event-Based System. ACM. p. 5.
- Ron, Sher; Aridor, Yariv; Etzion, Opher (April 2001). Mobile Transactional Agents. Distributed Computing Systems, 2001. 21st International Conference on. IEEE. pp. 73–80.
- Adi, Asaf; Botzer, David; Etzion, Opher; Yatzkar-Haham, Tali (2000). Push technology personalization through event correlation. VLDB. pp. 643–645.
- Etzion, Opher; Gal, Avigdor; Segev, Arie (1998). "Extended update functionality in temporal databases". Temporal Databases: Research and Practice. Springer Berlin Heidelberg. pp. 56–95. ISBN 9783540645191.
