= RTE (disambiguation) =

RTÉ (Raidió Teilifís Éireann) is the Irish public broadcaster.

RTE may also refer to:

== Business ==
- Real-time enterprise, who fulfil orders immediately
- Réseau de Transport d'Électricité, France's electrical transmission operator

== Politics ==
- Recep Tayyip Erdoğan (born 1954), president of Turkey
- Right to Education Act, a 2009 decree in India

== Science and technology ==
- Radiative transfer equation, in physics
- Rich-text editor, often provided by web applications
- Round-trip engineering, in programming tools
- Runtime environment, a subsystem a program runs in

== Transport ==
- Route 128 (Amtrak station), in Massachusetts, United States (by station code)
- Campo de Marte Airport, São Paulo, Brazil (by IATA code)
