= Luckham =

Luckham is an English surname. Notable people with the surname include:

- Cyril Luckham (1907–1989), English film, television and theatre actor
- David Luckham, (fl.1981–) American professor of electrical engineering
