= Relational data stream management system =

A relational data stream management system (RDSMS) is a distributed, in-memory data stream management system (DSMS) that is designed to use standards-compliant SQL queries to process unstructured and structured data streams in real-time. Unlike SQL queries executed in a traditional RDBMS, which return a result and exit, SQL queries executed in a RDSMS do not exit, generating results continuously as new data become available. Continuous SQL queries in a RDSMS use the SQL Window function to analyze, join and aggregate data streams over fixed or sliding windows. Windows can be specified as time-based or row-based.

== RDSMS SQL Query Examples ==
Continuous SQL queries in a RDSMS conform to the ANSI SQL standards. The most common RDSMS SQL query is performed with the declarative SELECT statement. A continuous SQL SELECT operates on data across one or more data streams, with optional keywords and clauses that include FROM with an optional JOIN subclause to specify the rules for joining multiple data streams, the WHERE clause and comparison predicate to restrict the records returned by the query, GROUP BY to project streams with common values into a smaller set, HAVING to filter records resulting from a GROUP BY, and ORDER BY to sort the results.

The following is an example of a continuous data stream aggregation using a SELECT query that aggregates a sensor stream from a weather monitoring station. The SELECTquery aggregates the minimum, maximum and average temperature values over a one-second time period, returning a continuous stream of aggregated results at one second intervals.

SELECT STREAM
    FLOOR(WEATHERSTREAM.ROWTIME to SECOND) AS FLOOR_SECOND,
    MIN(TEMP) AS MIN_TEMP,
    MAX(TEMP) AS MAX_TEMP,
    AVG(TEMP) AS AVG_TEMP
FROM WEATHERSTREAM
GROUP BY FLOOR(WEATHERSTREAM.ROWTIME TO SECOND);

RDSMS SQL queries also operate on data streams over time or row-based windows. The following example shows a second continuous SQL query using the WINDOW clause with a one-second duration. The WINDOW clause changes the behavior of the query, to output a result for each new record as it arrives. Hence the output is a stream of incrementally updated results with zero result latency.

SELECT STREAM
    ROWTIME,
    MIN(TEMP) OVER W1 AS WMIN_TEMP,
    MAX(TEMP) OVER W1 AS WMAX_TEMP,
    AVG(TEMP) OVER W1 AS WAVG_TEMP
FROM WEATHERSTREAM
WINDOW W1 AS ( RANGE INTERVAL '1' SECOND PRECEDING );

== See also ==
- NoSQL
- NewSQL
