= Internet messaging platform =

An Internet messaging platform is any system on the Internet that exchanges messages for the purpose of human communications.

Messaging platforms are considered one of few key Internet infrastructure elements. What used to be only referred to as email and IM has evolved into a complex multi-media email, instant messaging, and related fixed and mobile messaging infrastructure. One can argue that everything transmitted on the Internet and wireless telecommunication links is a message of one sort or another.

== History ==
In the beginning there was Sendmail and many other mail delivery agents soon followed (Postfix etc.) Once email spam and computer virus problems started becoming prevalent in the early 1990s. These critical Internet infrastructure systems had to be patched and the underlying protocols changed -or in some cases ignored- to deal with these issues. Thus was born the messaging platform. Large telecommunication operators and internet service providers needed flexible, easily deployed and scaled messaging systems for quickly growing messaging services and cell phone networks (for examples see SMS and BlackBerry.) The flexibility required related to the deployment or integration with anti-spam, anti-virus, business and end user required customization, prompted by in-house marketing concerns and usually provided by third party solutions. At the same time they had to be able to work with already deployed account authentication systems.

Some medium and large telecommunication operators have large investments in in-house solutions, others have always purchased third-party solutions. Smaller operators and ISPs have generally relied on open-source software, like Sendmail, and in-house system administrators for maintenance.

== See also ==
- Mail Delivery Agent
- Mail User Agent
