= Widom line =

Supercritical fluids boundary

Pressure–temperature phase diagram: The supercritical state is at pressures and temperatures above the critical point. The dashed green line shows the anomalous slope of solid-liquid phase boundary exhibited by some substances, including water - while the black dashed lines indicate borders of supercritical region

In the context of the pressure-temperature phase diagram of a substance and of the supercritical fluid state in particular, the Widom line is a line emanating from the critical point which in a way extends the liquid-vapor coexistence curve above the critical point. It corresponds to the maxima or minima of certain physical properties of the supercritical fluid, such as the speed of sound, isothermal compressibility, isochoric and isobaric heat capacities. A common criterion for locating the Widom line is indeed the maximum in the isobaric heat capacity.

More generally, the Widom line is defined as the line in the pressure-temperature phase diagram of a fluid substance along which the correlation length has its maximum. It always emanates from a critical point. It has been investigated for various systems, including for example in the context of the hypothesized liquid–liquid critical point (or second critical point) of water.

Similar boundary lines include the Fisher-Widom line and the Frenkel line, which also describe transitions between distinct fluid behaviors.

== Overview ==
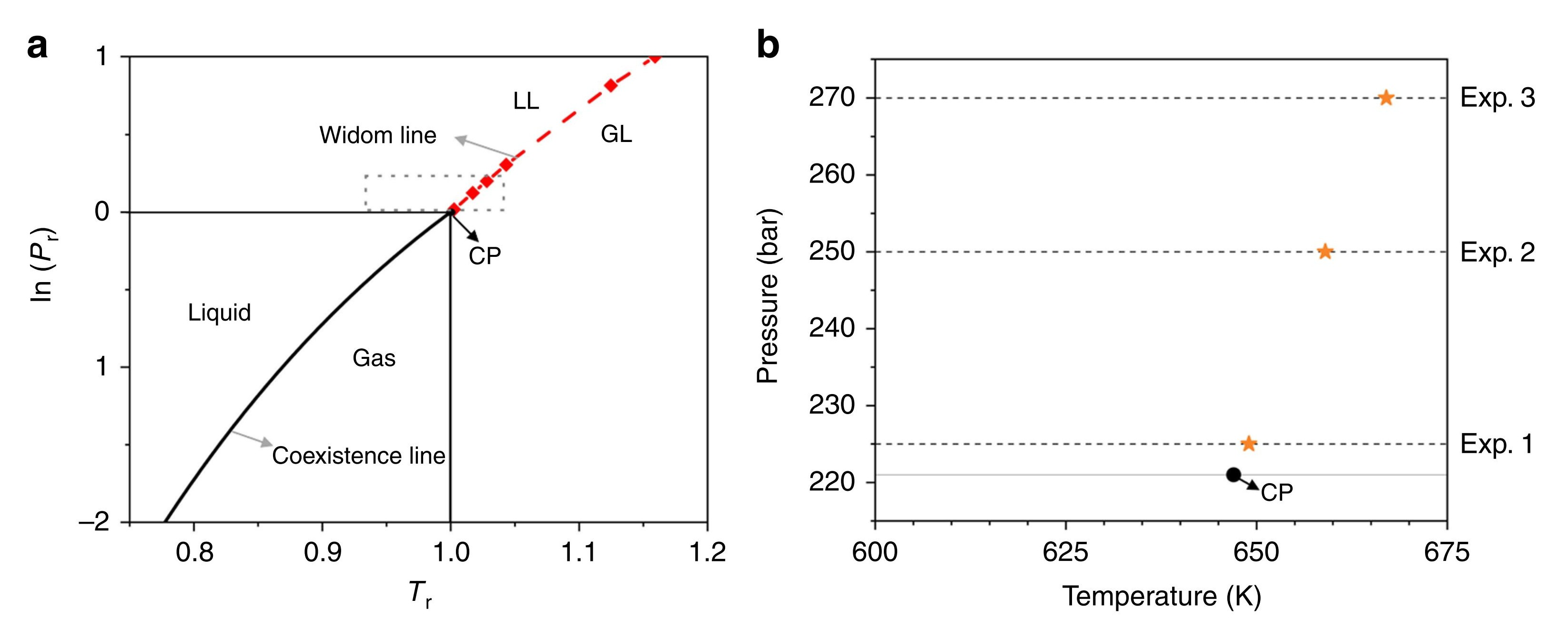
Visualization of supercritical water pseudo-boiling at Widom line crossover.Fig a. shows water states in plan of reduced pressure (Pr = P/Pcp) and reduced temperature (Tr = T/Tcp); coexistence line below critical point (CP) separates liquid and gas phases and Widom line above CP separates liquid-like (LL) and gas-like (GL) supercritical water states

Named after theoretical physicist Benjamin Widom, the Widom line is a crucial concept in fluid thermodynamics and critical phenomena. Such a concept is indeed relevant to the physical properties of any single-component fluid at sufficiently high pressures and temperatures, and its study is an active research area.

The Widom line has been suggested to separate liquid-like behaviour and gas-like behaviour in supercritical fluids, where the traditional distinction between liquid and gas no longer exists. Specifically, on the low-pressure side of the line, the fluid exhibits a gas-like behavior, while on the high-pressure side, it behaves more like a liquid. This separation is not a sharp phase change but a continuous crossover in some of the properties of the fluid. It has been observed in laboratory experiments, for example on fluid methane. The concept of Widom line provides a useful framework for characterizing and predicting the properties of fluids, which are important for scientific research as well as various industrial processes.

== See also ==
- Supercritical liquid–gas boundaries
- Phase diagram
