= Frenkel line =

Thermodynamic boundary

In thermodynamics, the Frenkel line is a proposed boundary on the phase diagram of a supercritical fluid, separating regions of qualitatively different behavior. Fluids on opposite sides of the line have been described as "liquidlike" or "gaslike", and exhibit different behaviors in terms of oscillation, excitation modes, and diffusion.

Other proposed similar boundary lines include for example the Fisher-Widom line and the Widom line.

== Overview ==
Two types of approaches to the behavior of liquids are present in the literature. The most common one is based on a van der Waals model. It treats the liquids as dense structureless gases. Although this approach allows explanation of many principal features of fluids, in particular the liquid-gas phase transition, it fails to explain other important issues such as, for example, the existence in liquids of transverse collective excitations such as phonons.

Another approach to fluid properties was proposed by Yakov Frenkel. It is based on the assumption that at moderate temperatures, the particles of liquid behave in a manner similar to a crystal, i.e. the particles demonstrate oscillatory motions. However, while in crystals they oscillate around their nodes, in liquids, after several periods, the particles change their nodes. This approach is based on postulation of some similarity between crystals and liquids, providing insight into many important properties of the latter: transverse collective excitations, large heat capacity, and so on.

From the discussion above, one can see that the microscopic behavior of particles of moderate and high temperature fluids is qualitatively different. If one heats a fluid from a temperature close to the melting point to some high temperature, a crossover from the solid-like to the gas-like regime occurs. The line of this crossover was named the Frenkel line, after Yakov Frenkel.

Several methods to locate the Frenkel line are proposed in the literature. The exact criterion defining the Frenkel line is the one based on a comparison of characteristic times in fluids. One can define a 'jump time' via

$$\tau_0=\frac{a^2}{6D}$$,

where $a$ is the size of the particle and $D$ is the diffusion coefficient. This is the time necessary for a particle to move a distance comparable to its own size. The second characteristic time corresponds to the shortest period of transverse oscillations of particles within the fluid, $\tau^*$. When these two time scales are roughly equal, one cannot distinguish between the oscillations of the particles and their jumps to another position. Thus the criterion for the Frenkel line is given by $\tau_0 \approx \tau^*$.

There exist several approximate criteria to locate the Frenkel line on the pressure-temperature plane. One of these criteria is based on the velocity autocorrelation function (vacf): below the Frenkel line, the vacf demonstrates oscillatory behaviour, while above it, the vacf monotonically decays to zero. The second criterion is based on the fact that at moderate temperatures, liquids can sustain transverse excitations, which disappear upon heating. One further criterion is based on isochoric heat capacity measurements. The isochoric heat capacity per particle of a monatomic liquid near the melting line is close to $3 k_B$ (where $k_B$ is the Boltzmann constant). The contribution to the heat capacity due to the potential part of transverse excitations is $1 k_B$. Therefore, at the Frenkel line, where transverse excitations vanish, the isochoric heat capacity per particle should be $c_V=2 k_B$, a direct prediction from the phonon theory of liquid thermodynamics.

Crossing the Frenkel line leads also to some structural crossovers in fluids. Currently Frenkel lines of several idealised liquids, such as Lennard-Jones and soft spheres, as well as realistic models such as liquid iron, hydrogen, water, and carbon dioxide, have been reported in the literature.

== See also ==
- Supercritical liquid–gas boundaries
