= Jennifer Widom =

American computer scientist

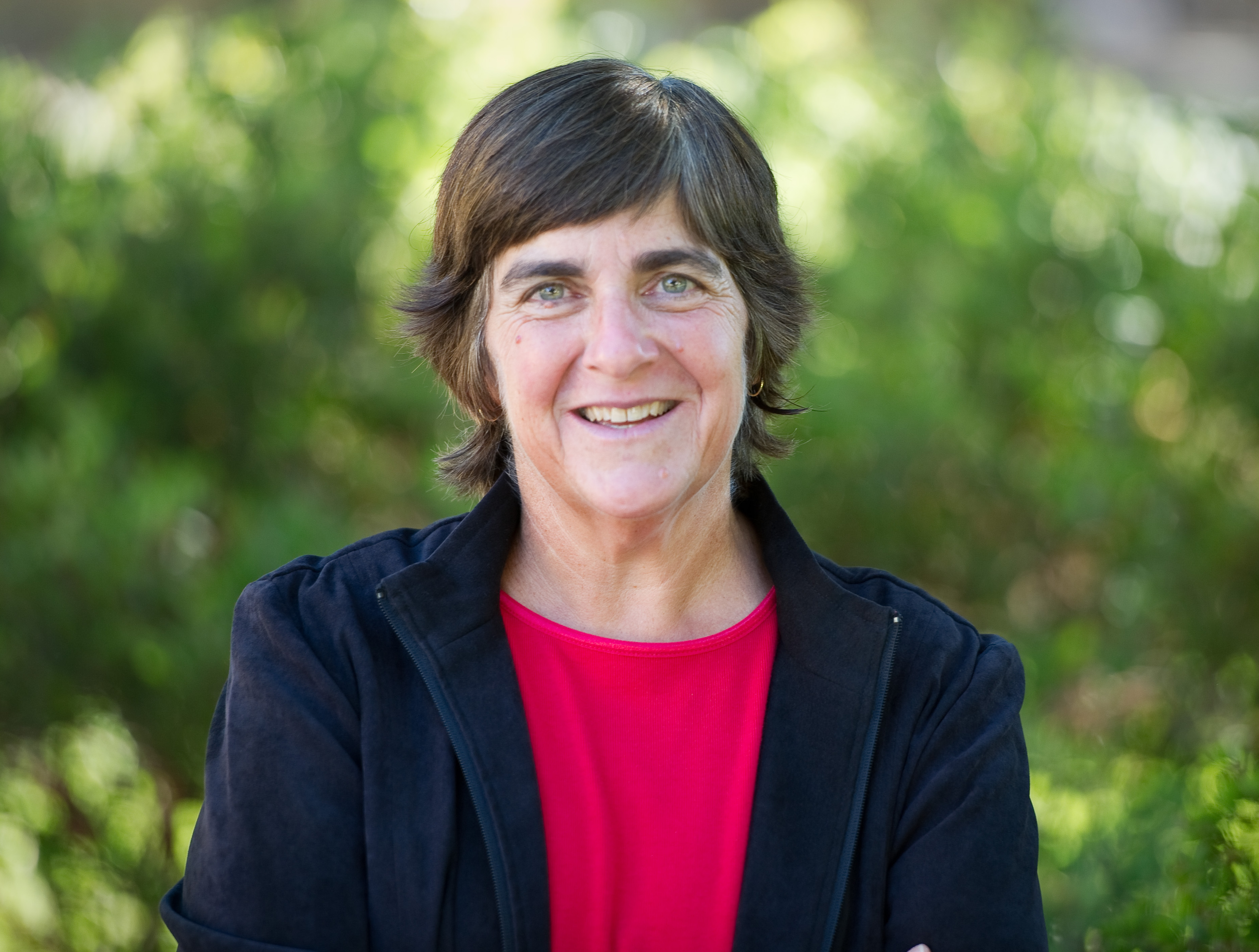
- Born: 1960 or 1961 (age 65–66)
- Education: Cornell University (Ph.D., M.S.); Indiana University Jacobs School of Music (B.S.)
- Known for: Semi-structured data model; Data stream management system; Active database
- Children: 2
- Father: Harold Widom
- Relatives: Benjamin Widom (uncle)
- Scientific career
- Workplaces: Stanford University; IBM Almaden Research Center; Cornell University; Xerox Palo Alto Research Center
- Thesis: Trace-Based Network Proof Systems: Expressiveness and Completeness (1987)
- Doctoral advisor: David Gries
- Doctoral students: Parag Agrawal
- Website: cs.stanford.edu/people/widom/

Jennifer Widom (born 1960 or 1961) is an American computer scientist known for her work in database systems and data management. She is notable for foundational contributions to semi-structured data management and data stream management systems. Since 2017, Widom is the dean of the School of Engineering and professor of computer science at Stanford University. Her honors include the Fletcher Jones Professor of Computer Science and multiple lifetime achievement awards from the Association for Computing Machinery.

== Education ==
Widom earned a bachelor's degree in trumpet performance from the Indiana University Jacobs School of Music in 1982 and a PhD in computer science under David Gries from Cornell University in 1987.

== Academic career ==
Widom began her career as a researcher at the IBM Almaden Research Center and joined Stanford University as a professor in 1993. She was the chair of the Stanford computer science department from 2009 to 2014, and served as senior associate dean for faculty and academic affairs in the School of Engineering from 2014 to 2016. In February 2017 she was named Dean of the School of Engineering.

Widom is a fellow of the Association for Computing Machinery (ACM) since 2005. In 2015, she won the ACM-W Athena Lecturer Award, which honors prominent female computer scientists, for her work in the introduction of fundamental concepts and architectures of active database systems. Widom is also a member of the National Academy of Engineering and the American Academy of Arts and Sciences.

Widom has co-authored four academic textbooks on database systems. These books focus on database design, use, and implementation of applications and management systems. The course materials have been utilized at the junior, senior, and graduate levels in the computer science department.

In late 2011, Widom launched one of the first Massive Open Online Courses (MOOCs), entitled "Introduction to Databases". The course had more than 100,000 enrolled students, and launched at the same time as two other MOOCs by Stanford University School of Engineering faculty. In 2018, she won the Erna Hamburger prize from the Swiss Federal Institute of Technology in Lausanne -Women in Science and Humanities Foundation for her work with MOOCs.

== Personal life ==
Widom is the daughter of Lois Widom and Harold Widom, an American mathematician. Her uncle Benjamin Widom was on the Cornell faculty in chemistry. Widom is married to Alex Aiken, former chair of Stanford's computer science department. The couple has a son and a daughter.

== Selected works ==
- Widom, Jennifer; (with H. Garcia-Molina and J. D. Ullman). Database Systems: The Complete Book, New Jersey: Prentice-Hall, 2002. ISBN 978-0-13-031995-1
- Widom, Jennifer; (with J. D. Ullman). A First Course in Database Systems, New Jersey: Prentice-Hall, 1997 and 2002. ISBN 978-0-13-035300-9
- Widom, Jennifer; (with H. Garcia-Molina and J.D. Ullman). Database System Implementation, New Jersey: Prentice-Hall, 2000. ISBN 978-0-13-040264-6
- Widom, Jennifer; (with S. Ceri). Active Database Systems: Triggers and Rules for Advanced Database Processing, San Francisco: Morgan Kaufmann, 1996. ISBN 978-1-55860-304-2
