= Benjamin Widom =

American physical chemist (1927–2025)

- Born: October 13, 1927; Newark, New Jersey, U.S.
- Died: January 23, 2025 (aged 97); Ithaca, New York, U.S.
- Education: Cornell University; Columbia University
- Known for: Widom scaling Widom insertion method Widom line Fisher-Widom line
- Awards: Irving Langmuir Award (1982); Boltzmann medal (1998)
- Scientific career
- Fields: Statistical Mechanics
- Workplaces: Cornell University

Benjamin Widom (October 13, 1927 – January 23, 2025) was an American physical chemist. He was the Goldwin Smith Professor of Chemistry at Cornell University. His research interests included physical chemistry and statistical mechanics. In 1998, Widom was awarded the Boltzmann Medal "for his illuminating studies of the statistical mechanics of fluids and fluid mixtures and their interfacial properties, especially his clear and general formulation of scaling hypotheses for the equation of state and surface tensions of fluids near critical points."

Widom's professional papers are archived at Cornell University.

== Academic background ==
Widom was born in Newark, New Jersey. His younger brother was mathematician Harold Widom. He graduated from New York City's Stuyvesant High School in 1945, and received his BA from Columbia University in 1949, followed by his PhD from Cornell in 1953. He became an instructor of chemistry at Cornell in 1954, was appointed assistant professor in 1955 and a full professor in 1963. He was chair of the chemistry department between 1978 and 1981. He was elected a member of the National Academy of Sciences in 1974 and a fellow of the American Academy of Arts and Sciences in 1979.

== Personal life ==
Widom was father to Michael Widom, a professor of physics at Carnegie Mellon University, Elizabeth Widom, a professor of geology at Miami University, and Jonathan Widom, a professor of biochemistry at Northwestern University.

He was brother to Harold Widom, professor emeritus of mathematics at U. C. Santa Cruz.

Widom's niece Jennifer Widom is the Frederick Emmons Terman Dean of the Stanford School of Engineering and the Fletcher Jones Professor of Computer Science.

== Death ==
Widom died in Ithaca, New York, on January 23, 2025. He was 97.

== Publications ==
- Theoretical modeling: An introduction. Ber. Bunsenges. Phys. Chem. 1996, 100, 242.
- Theory of phase equilibrium. J. Phys. Chem. 1996, 100, 13190.
- Lekkerkerker, H.N.W.; Widom, B. An Exactly Solvable Model for Depletion Phenomena. Physica A 2000, 285, 483-492.
- Barkema, G.T.; Widom, B. Model of Hydrophobic Attraction in Two and Three Dimensions. J. Chem Phys. 2000, 113, 2349-2353.
- Weiss, V.C.; Widom, B. Contact Angles in Sequential Wetting: Pentane On Water. Physica A 2001, 292, 137-145.
- Widom, B. Surface Tension and Molecular Correlations near the Critical Point, J. Chem. Phys. 1965, 43, 3892-3897.
- Widom, B. Equation of State in the Neighborhood of the Critical Point, J. Chem. Phys. 1965, 43, 3898-3905.
- Widom, B.; Bhimalapuram, P; Koga, K. The Hydrophobic Effect. Phys. Chem. Chem. Phys. (PCCP) 2003, 5, 3085-3093.

== Awards ==
- New York Academy of Sciences Boris Pregel Award in Chemical Physics
- ACS Langmuir Medal in Chemical Physics, 1982
- ACS Hildebrand Award in Theoretical and Experimental Chemistry of Liquids
- Carnegie-Mellon University Dickson Prize for Science, 1987
- University of Wisconsin–Madison Hirschfelder Prize
- Royal Netherlands Academy of Arts and Sciences, Bakhuys Roozeboom Medal
- Onsager Lectureship, 1994
- Boltzmann Medal, 1998
- IUPAP Commission on Statistical Physics, 1998
- ACS Award in Theoretical Chemistry, 1999
- National Academy of Sciences
- American Philosophical Society
- American Academy of Arts and Sciences Fellow
- New York Academy of Sciences Fellow
