= Azure Stream Analytics =

Cloud-based event processing service

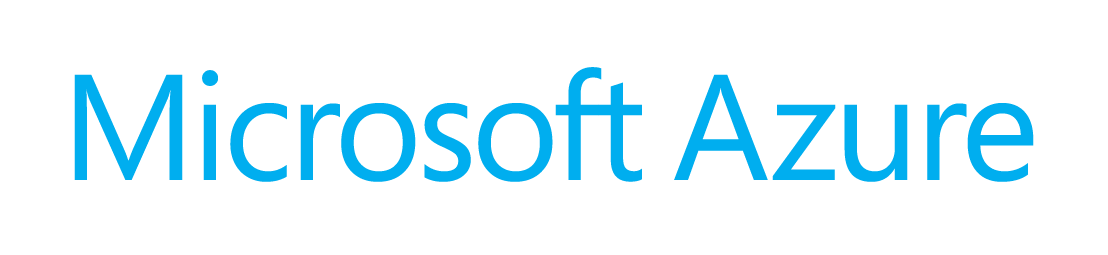
- Developer(s): Microsoft
- Available in: English
- Type: Complex event processing engine
- Website: azure.microsoft.com/en-us/services/stream-analytics/

Microsoft Azure Stream Analytics is a serverless scalable complex event processing engine by Microsoft that enables users to develop and run real-time analytics on multiple streams of data from sources such as devices, sensors, web sites, social media, and other applications. Users can set up alerts to detect anomalies, predict trends, trigger necessary workflows when certain conditions are observed, and make data available to other downstream applications and services for presentation, archiving, or further analysis.

== Query Language ==
Users can author real-time analytics using a simple declarative SQL-like language with embedded support for temporal logic. Callouts to custom code with JavaScript user defined functions extend the streaming logic written in SQL. Callouts to Azure Machine Learning helps with predictive scoring on streaming data.

== Scalability ==
Azure Stream Analytics is a serverless job service on Azure that eliminates the need for infrastructure, servers, virtual machines, or managed clusters. Users only pay for the processing used for the running jobs.

== IoT applications ==
Azure Stream Analytics integrates with Azure IoT Hub to enable real-time analytics on data from IoT devices and applications.

== Real-time Dashboards ==
Users can build real-time dashboards with Power BI for a live command and control view. Real-time dashboards help transform live data into actionable and insightful visuals.

== Data Input Sources ==
Stream Analytics supports three different types of input sources - Azure Event Hubs, Azure IoT Hubs, and Azure Blob Storage. Additionally, stream analytics supports Azure Blob storage as the input reference data to help augment fast moving event data streams with static data.

Stream analytics supports a wide variety of output targets. Support for Power BI allows for real-time dashboarding. Event Hub, Service bus topics and queues help trigger downstream workflows. Support for Azure Table Storage, Azure SQL Databases, Azure SQL Data Warehouse, Azure SQL, Document DB, Azure Data Lake Store enable a variety of downstream analysis and archiving capabilities.
