= Resource allocation (computing) =

Process for meeting the hardware requirements of a software application

Resource allocation is the process by which a computing system aims to meet the hardware requirements of an application run by it. Computing, networking and energy resources must be optimised taking into account hardware, performance and environmental restrictions. This process may be undertaken by the hardware itself, an operating system, a distributed computing system, or as part of data center management.

== See also ==
- Concurrency control
