= Supercritical liquid–gas boundaries =

Lines on pressure-temperature diageam indicating proprties if a supercritical fluid

Supercritical liquid–gas boundaries are lines in the pressure-temperature (pT) diagram that delimit more liquid-like and more gas-like states of a supercritical fluid. They comprise the Fisher–Widom line, the Widom line, and the Frenkel line.

== Overview ==
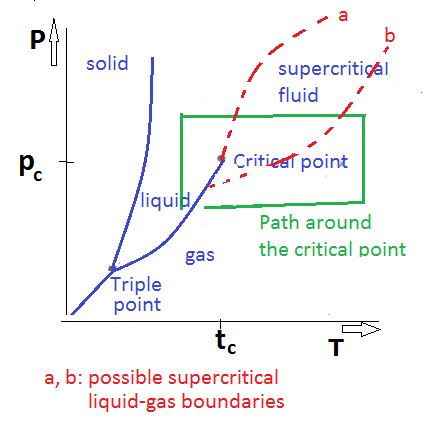
supercritical gas-liquid boundaries in pT diagram

According to textbook knowledge, it is possible to transform a liquid continuously into a gas, without undergoing a phase transition, by heating and compressing strongly enough to go around the critical point. However, different criteria still allow to distinguish liquid-like and more gas-like states of a supercritical fluid. These criteria result in different boundaries in the pT plane. These lines emanate either from the critical point, or from the liquid–vapor boundary (boiling curve) somewhat below the critical point. They do not correspond to first or second order phase transitions, but to weaker singularities.

The Fisher–Widom line is the boundary between monotonic and oscillating asymptotics of the pair correlation function $G(\vec{r})$.

The Widom line is a generalization thereof, apparently so named by H. Eugene Stanley. However, it was first measured experimentally in 1956 by Jones and Walker, and subsequently named the 'hypercritical line' by Bernal in 1964, who suggested a structural interpretation.

A common criterion for the Widom line is a peak in the isobaric heat capacity. In the subcritical region, the phase transition is associated with an effective spike in the heat capacity (i.e., the latent heat). Approaching the critical point, the latent heat falls to zero but this is accompanied by a gradual rise in heat capacity in the pure phases near phase transition. At the critical point, the latent heat is zero but the heat capacity shows a diverging singularity. Beyond the critical point, there is no divergence, but rather a smooth peak in the heat capacity; the highest point of this peak identifies the Widom line.

The Frenkel line is a boundary between "rigid" and "non-rigid" fluids characterized by the onset of transverse sound modes. One of the criteria for locating the Frenkel line is based on the velocity autocorrelation function (vacf): below the Frenkel line the vacf demonstrates oscillatory behaviour, while above it the vacf monotonically decays to zero. The second criterion is based on the fact that at moderate temperatures liquids can sustain transverse excitations, which disappear upon heating. One further criterion is based on isochoric heat capacity measurements. The isochoric heat capacity per particle of a monatomic liquid near to the melting line is close to $3 k_B$ (where $k_B$ is the Boltzmann constant). The contribution to the heat capacity due to the potential part of transverse excitations is $1 k_B$. Therefore at the Frenkel line, where transverse excitations vanish, the isochoric heat capacity per particle should be $c_V=2 k_B$, a direct prediction from the phonon theory of liquid thermodynamics.

Anisimov et al. (2004), without referring to Frenkel, Fisher, or Widom, reviewed thermodynamic derivatives (specific heat, expansion coefficient, compressibility) and transport coefficients (viscosity, speed of sound) in supercritical water, and found pronounced extrema as a function of pressure up to 100 K above the critical temperature.

Quite recent studies on high-pressure water along a near-critical, supercritical isotherm have also proposed several criteria, based upon several structure order parameters, thermodynamic and dynamic properties of water, in order to locate the crossing of the Frenkel line. The existence of local extrema and crossovers in a wide range of properties, located at the same temperature and pressure conditions in those studies, provided more general criteria for the location of the Frenkel line in supercritical water. Moreover, the rapid increase of the ratio Srot/Strans (where Srot, Strans are the rotational and translational entropy of water) when crossing the Frenkel line clearly indicated the existence of a transition from a "soft", liquid-like, fluid to a "rigid" liquid, where rotational motions start to become more pronounced in comparison with the translational ones. The observed isosbestic points in the translational and rotational density of states are also blue-shifted when the Frenkel line is crossed. Interestingly, at very high pressures (along the same near-critical, supercritical isotherm) the crossing of a melting line was observed and a first-order transition to a face-centered cubic (fcc) plastic crystal phase was also revealed in those studies.

Previous studies on supercritical water also revealed that at a near-critical, supercritical isotherm and at the density range around 0.2 ρc (ρc is the critical density) another crossover was also observed, which had been attributed to a structural transition from a supercritical fluid to a gas-like system, where the water molecules tend to locate randomly around a central molecule. At densities lower than 0.2 ρc supercritical water resembles a dilute gas consisting of randomly distributed molecules. All the previously mentioned findings indicate that a near-critical isotherm can be divided in different domains where supercritical water exhibits distinct behavior, ranging from a gas-like behavior to a plastic crystal one.
