= Real-time enterprise =

Real-time enterprise (commonly abbreviated to RTE) is a concept in business systems design focused on ensuring organisational responsiveness that was popularised in the first decade of the 21st century. It is also referred to as on-demand enterprise. Such an enterprise must be able to fulfill orders as soon as they are needed, and current information is available within a company at all times. This is achieved through the use of integrated systems including ERP, CRM and SCM.

Though not particularly well defined, generally accepted goals of an RTE include:

- Reduced response times for partners and customers
- Increased transparency, for example sharing or reporting information across an enterprise instead of keeping it within individual departments
- Increased automation, including communications, accounting, supply chains and reporting
- Increased competitiveness
- Reduced costs

== See also ==
- Business process management (BPM)
- Complex event processing (CEP)
- Enterprise resource planning (ERP)
- Customer relationship management (CRM)
- Supply chain management (SCM)
