= David Luckham =

American computer scientist

- Born: Kingston, Colony of Jamaica, British Empire
- Citizenship: United Kingdom, United States
- Education: Ph.D., MIT
- Known for: Lisp; Automated theorem proving Stanford Pascal Verifier; Complex event processing Rational Software
- Scientific career
- Fields: Computer science
- Workplaces: University of California, Los Angeles (UCLA); Stanford University
- Website: profiles.stanford.edu/david-luckham

David Luckham is an emeritus professor of electrical engineering at Stanford University. As a graduate student at the Massachusetts Institute of Technology (MIT), he was one of the implementers of the first systems for the programming language Lisp.

He is best known as the originator of complex event processing (CEP) as proposed in his 2002 book The Power of Events. CEP consists of a set of concepts and techniques for processing real-time events and extracting information from event streams as they arrive. CEP has since become an enabling technology in many systems that are used to take immediate action in response to incoming streams of events. Applications are described in this book that may now be found in many sectors of business including stock market trading systems, mobile devices, internet operations, fraud detection, the transport industry, and government intelligence gathering. The book also describes advanced event processing techniques such as event abstraction and event hierarchies that are not yet in general practice. Luckham's latest book is Event Processing for Business: Organizing the Real-Time Enterprise.

Luckham has held faculty and invited faculty positions in both mathematics and computer science at eight major universities in Europe and the United States. He was a cofounder of Rational Software, Inc., in 1981. He supplied the compiler for the language Ada, from which the company's first products were developed, and served as a member of the initial software development team. An acknowledged leader in high-level programming languages for multiprocessing, annotation languages, and event-based simulation systems for both hardware and software architectures, Luckham has published more than 100 technical articles, two of them winning Best Paper Awards from the Association for Computing Machinery (ACM) and the Institute of Electrical and Electronics Engineers (IEEE).

He was born in Kingston in the British Colony of Jamaica, and raised in London during The Blitz of World War II. He holds the degrees Master of Science (M.Sc.) from London, and Doctor of Philosophy (Ph.D.) from the Massachusetts Institute of Technology (MIT) in mathematics and computer science.
