= Internet infrastructure =

Infrastructure without which the Internet would not function

Internet infrastructure refers to the physical systems that provide internet communication. It includes networking cables, cellular towers, servers, internet exchange points, data centers, and individual computers.

== Background ==
Several studies and events have helped define the scope of critical Internet infrastructure. In August 2013, Internet infrastructure experts including Yuval Shavitt, Bill Woodcock, Rossella Mattioli, Thomas Haeberlen, Ethan Katz-Bassett and Roland Dobbins convened for six days at Schloss Dagstuhl to refine the academic and policy understanding of critical Internet infrastructure, producing a number of papers in the process. In 2017, the Global Commission on the Stability of Cyberspace undertook a global survey of Internet infrastructure experts in order to assess the degree of consensus on what constituted critical Internet infrastructure, producing a Definition of the Public Core which has since been used by the OECD and others as a standardized description of the principal elements of Internet critical infrastructure. In addition to these globally applicable findings, nationally-specific definitions have been made by individual governments, for example by the US Government Accountability Office in 2006 and the US White House in 2013.

== GCSC definition ==
The report of the GCSC Critical Infrastructure Assessment Working Group has summarized the results of their survey in a comprehensive definition of Critical Internet infrastructure, which includes the following elements:

- Packet routing and forwarding
- Naming and numbering systems
- Security and identity protection
- Physical transmission media

== See also ==
- Critical infrastructure
- Global Commission on the Stability of Cyberspace
