= SEU =

SEU or Seu may refer to:

Universities

- Southeast University, Nanjing, Jiangsu Province, China
- Southeast University (Bangladesh), in Banani, Dhaka
- Southeastern University (disambiguation)
- St. Edward's University, Austin, Texas, USA
- Saudi Electronic University, Riyadh, Saudi Arabia

Other organisations

- Social Exclusion Unit, a British Government task force to address social exclusion
- Sindicato Español Universitario, a corporatist students' union in Francoist Spain
- Sustainable Energy Utility, a community based model of development based on energy conservation and community-scale renewables

Other

- Significant Energy Use, topic of energy-management, as treated in ISO 50001
- Single-event upset, a change of state caused by a high-energy particle strike to a micro-electronic device
- slightly enriched uranium, a very low enrichment of uranium to 0.9% to 2% ^{235}U.
- subjective expected utility, the attractiveness of an economic opportunity as perceived by a decision-maker in the presence of risk
- Shoot 'em up, a video game subgenre
- Source Entry Utility or Source Edit Utility, a tool to edit program sources on IBM RPG, IBM System/32, System Support Program, and IBM i

== See also ==
- La Seu (disambiguation)
