= SC =

SC, Sc or sc may refer to:

== Arts and media ==
- Snapchat, a multimedia messaging app
- Soccer club, another name for a football club in association football
- Social club, a type of club.
- Soulcalibur, fighting video game series created by Namco
- SoundCloud, an online audio distribution platform and music sharing website
- SportsCenter, an American daily sports-news program broadcast on ESPN
- SportsCentre, a Canadian daily sports-news program broadcast on TSN
- Sports club, a sporting club organized for the purpose of playing sports
- Supreme Commander, a real-time strategy video game
- StarCraft, a real-time strategy video game made by Blizzard Entertainment

== Businesses ==
- SC Paragliding, a defunct Ukrainian aircraft manufacturer
- SCTV (Indonesia) (Surya Citra Television), an Indonesian television network
- Shandong Airlines, IATA airline designation
- Standard Chartered, a multinational bank company headquartered in London England

== Education ==
- Hong Kong School Certificate Examination, a standardized examination from 1974 to 2011
- Scots College, Wellington, New Zealand
- Southland College, Philippines
- St. Christopher's School, Harare, Zimbabwe
- University of South Carolina, Columbia, South Carolina, United States
  - South Carolina Gamecocks, the Division I athletic program
- University of Southern California, Los Angeles, California, United States
  - Southern California Trojans, the Division I athletic program
- Sierra Canyon School, California, United States

== Language ==
- Sc (digraph), a combination of letters used in the spelling of some languages
- "sc.", abbreviation for scilicet, Latin for "it is permitted to know"; See viz.
- Sardinian language, ISO 639 language code
- small caps
- Standard Chinese
- Simplified Chinese characters

== Government, law, and military ==
- SC convoys, a series of Allied convoys that ran during the battle of the Atlantic during World War II
- Scheduled Castes, officially designated groups of historically disadvantaged people in India
- Security Check, a level of security clearance in the United Kingdom
- Post-nominal letters for Senior Counsel, or State Counsel in some countries
- Special constable, auxiliary police constable
- Special Constabulary, auxiliary police force
- Star of Courage (Australia), an Australian decoration
- Star of Courage (Canada), a Canadian decoration
- Statutes of Canada, a compilation of all the federal laws passed by the Parliament of Canada since Confederation in 1867
- The Supreme Court, the highest court in many legal jurisdictions
- United Nations Security Council
- Submarine chaser boat
- A US Navy hull classification symbol: Submarine chaser (SC)
- Sacrosanctum Concilium one of the constitutions of the Second Vatican Council.
- SC radar, an American-made air and surface-search radar used during World War II

== Places ==
- Santa Catarina (state), ISO 3166-2 and Brazilian state abbreviation
- Saint Kitts and Nevis, NATO country code
- Secunderabad Railway Station, station code, Hyderabad, India
- Seychelles, ISO 3166-1 alpha-2 country code
- Sichuan, Guobiao abbreviation SC, a province of China
- South Carolina, a state in the Eastern US
- Southern California, a US urban area centered on Los Angeles
- Santa Cruz, a city in California, US
- State College, a city in Pennsylvania, US

== Science and technology ==
=== Computing ===
- .sc, the country code top-level domain (ccTLD) for Seychelles
- SC, a type of optical fiber connector, of a push-pull coupling style
- SC (complexity), a complexity class in computer science, named after Stephen Cook
- sc.exe, a "Service Control" utility for managing Microsoft Windows services
- sc (spreadsheet calculator), a text-based Unix spreadsheet program
- PC/SC, specification for smart-card integration into computers
- Scientific computation, a discipline in computing
- ACM/IEEE Supercomputing Conference, known as SC or Supercomputing Conference

=== Other uses in science and technology ===
- Lexus SC, a personal luxury car
- Bitter SC, a luxury car
- sc (elliptic function), one of Jacobi's elliptic functions
- Scandium, symbol Sc, a chemical element
- Schmidt number (Sc), in fluid dynamics
- × Sophrocattleya (abbreviation Sc), an orchid genus
- Subcutaneous injection or administration, abbreviation
- Superior colliculus, a brain region involved with eye movements
- Clayey sand, in the Unified Soil Classification System
- Sodium cyanide
- Switched capacitor, an electronic circuit element implementing a filter

== Other uses ==
- "Steeplechase" athletics abbreviation in track and field

== See also ==
- SCC (disambiguation)
- SC2 (disambiguation)
- SCSC (disambiguation)
