= TerraScale =

TerraScale may refer to:

- Intel Tera-Scale
- AMD TeraScale (microarchitecture)
- TerraScale (company), a green data centre company.
