= Xeon Phi =

Series of x86 manycore processors from Intel

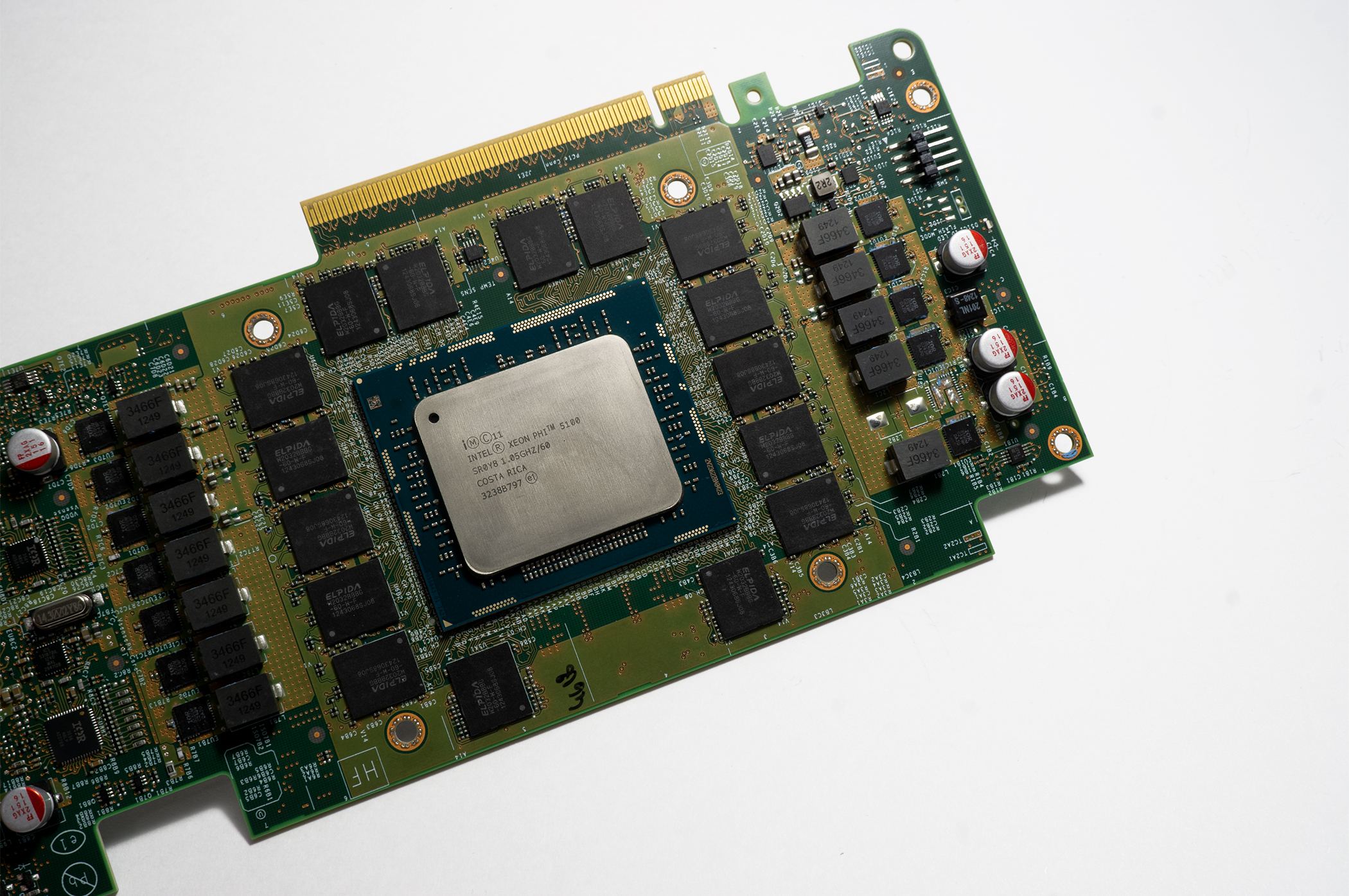
- Xeon Phi 5100 without heatsink

General information
- Launched: 2010
- Discontinued: 2020
- Marketed by: Intel
- Designed by: Intel
- Common manufacturer: Intel

Performance
- Max. CPU clock rate: 1.053 GHz to 1.7 GHz

Physical specifications
- Cores: 32-72
- Memory (RAM): Up to 384 GB and 16 GB; Up to DDR4 115.4 GB/s with ECC support; MCDRAM 400+ GB/s
- Sockets: LGA 3647; PCI Express 3.0 x16

Cache
- L1 cache: 32 KB per core
- L2 cache: 512 KB per core

Architecture and classification
- Application: Supercomputers; High-performance computing
- Technology node: 45 nm transistors to 14 nm transistors (tri-gate)
- Microarchitecture: Larrabee
- Instruction set: x86-16 (except coprocessor form factor), IA-32, x86-64
- Extensions: AVX, AVX2, AVX-512

Products, models, variants
- Core names: Knights Ferry; Knights Corner; Knights Landing; Knights Mill; ~~Knights Hill~~
- Model: Xeon Phi 3100; Xeon Phi 5100; Xeon Phi 7100; Xeon Phi 7200

Xeon Phi is a discontinued series of x86 manycore processors designed and made by Intel. It was intended for use in supercomputers, servers, and high-end workstations. Its architecture allowed use of standard programming languages and application programming interfaces (APIs) such as OpenMP.

Xeon Phi launched in 2010. Since it was originally based on an earlier GPU design (codenamed "Larrabee") by Intel that was cancelled in 2009, it shared application areas with GPUs. The main difference between Xeon Phi and a GPGPU like Nvidia Tesla was that Xeon Phi, with an x86-compatible core, could, with less modification, run software that was originally targeted to a standard x86 CPU.

Initially in the form of PCI Express-based add-on cards, a second-generation product, codenamed Knights Landing, was announced in June 2013. These second-generation chips could be used as a standalone CPU, rather than just as an add-in card.

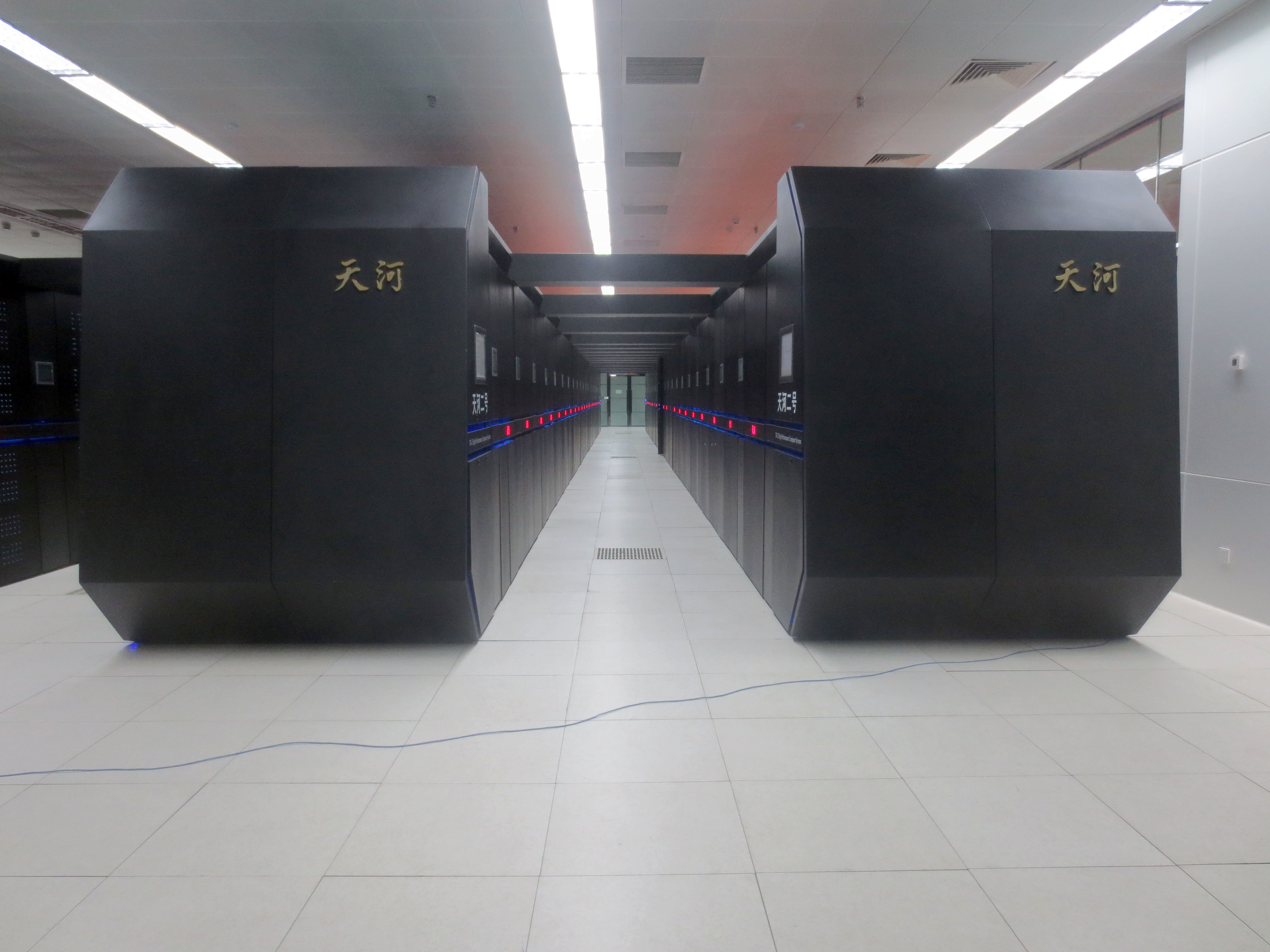
The Tianhe-2 supercomputer uses Xeon Phi processors.

The 2013 Tianhe-2 supercomputer at the National Supercomputer Center in Guangzhou (NSCC-GZ) was the world's fastest supercomputer until November, 2015. It used Intel Xeon Phi coprocessors and Ivy Bridge-EP Xeon E5 v2 processors to achieve 33.86 petaFLOPS of performance. The Xeon Phi coprocessors were eventually phased out by the end of 2017 and replaced by custom-built Matrix-2000 coprocessors.

The Xeon Phi product line aimed to compete with Nvidia's Tesla and AMD Radeon Instinct lines, targeting machine learning and GPGPU use cases. It was discontinued due to a lack of demand and Intel's problems with its 10 nm node.

== History ==
Code name	Process node	Comments
Knights Ferry	45 nm	offered as PCI Express card; derived from Larrabee project
Knights Corner	22 nm, FinFET	derived from P54C; vector processing unit; first device to be announced as Xeon Phi; AVX-512-like encoding
Knights Landing	14 nm, FinFET	derived from Silvermont/Airmont (Intel Atom); AVX-512
Knights Mill	14 nm, FinFET	nearly identical to Knights Landing but optimized for deep learning
Knights Hill	10 nm, FinFET	cancelled

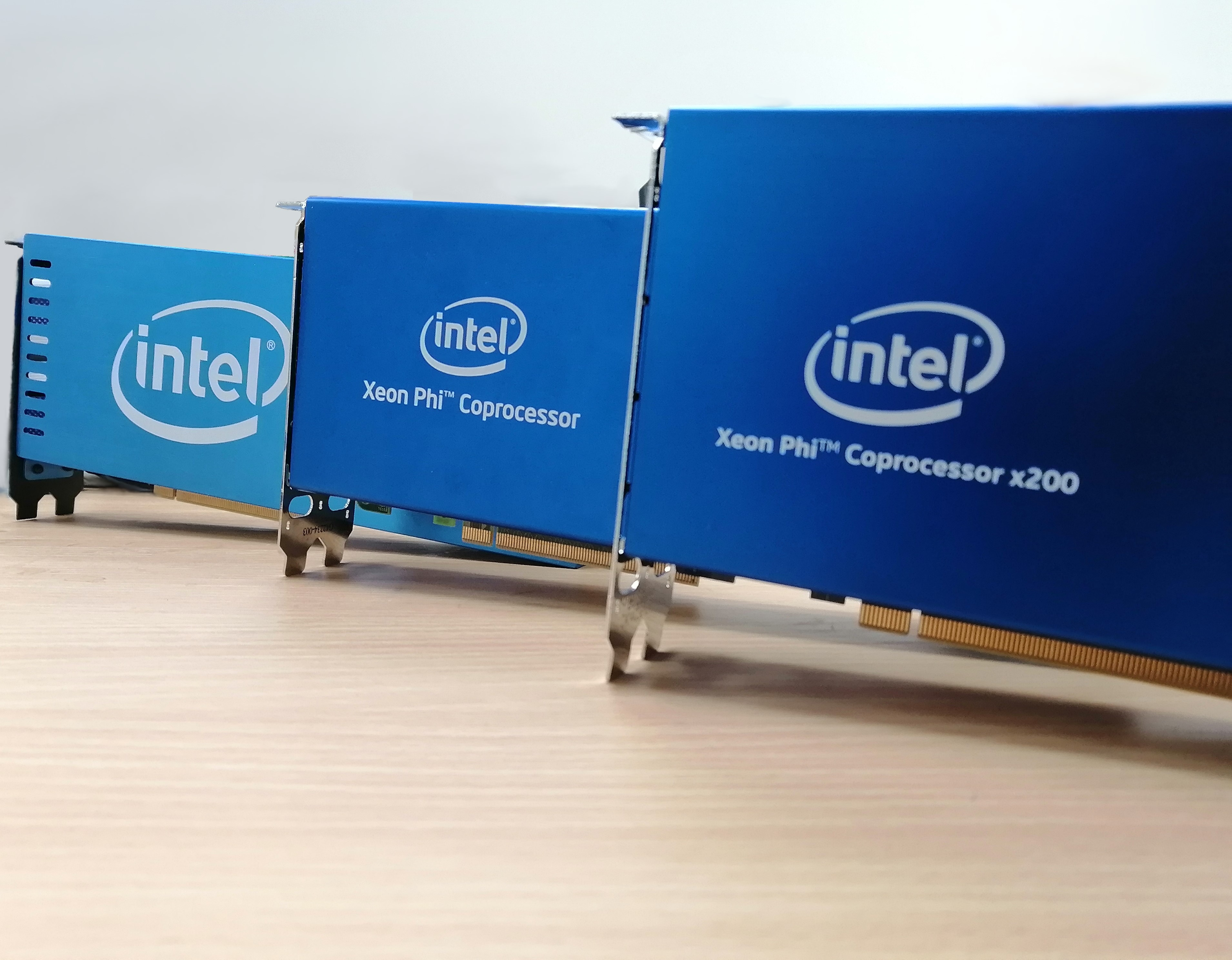
A lineup of the Xeon Phi coprocessors. From the left; Knights Ferry, Knights Corner, Knights Landing.

=== Background ===
The Larrabee microarchitecture (in development since 2006) introduced very wide (512-bit) SIMD units to an x86 architecture based processor design, extended to a cache-coherent multiprocessor system connected via a ring bus to memory; each core was capable of four-way multithreading. Due to the design being intended for GPU as well as general purpose computing, the Larrabee chips also included specialised hardware for texture sampling. The project to produce a retail GPU product directly from the Larrabee research project was terminated in May 2010.

Another contemporary Intel research project implementing x86 architecture on a many-multicore processor was the 'Single-chip Cloud Computer' (prototype introduced 2009), a design mimicking a cloud computing computer datacentre on a single chip with multiple independent cores: the prototype design included 48 cores per chip with hardware support for selective frequency and voltage control of cores to maximize energy efficiency, and incorporated a mesh network for inter-chip messaging. The design lacked cache-coherent cores and focused on principles that would allow the design to scale to many more cores.

The Teraflops Research Chip (prototype unveiled 2007) is an experimental 80-core chip with two floating-point units per core, implementing a 96-bit VLIW architecture instead of the x86 architecture. The project investigated intercore communication methods, per-chip power management, and achieved 1.01 TFLOPS at 3.16 GHz consuming 62 W of power.

=== Knights Ferry ===
Intel's Many Integrated Core (MIC) prototype board, named Knights Ferry, incorporating a processor codenamed Aubrey Isle was announced 31 May 2010. The product was stated to be a derivative of the Larrabee project and other Intel research including the Single-chip Cloud Computer.

The development product was offered as a PCIe card with 32 in-order cores at up to 1.2 GHz with four threads per core, 2 GB GDDR5 memory, and 8 MB coherent L2 cache (256 KB per core with 32 KB L1 cache), and a power requirement of ≈300 W, built at a 45 nm process. In the Aubrey Isle core a 1,024-bit ring bus (512-bit bi-directional) connects processors to main memory. Single-board performance has exceeded 750 GFLOPS. The prototype boards only support single-precision floating-point instructions.

Initial developers included CERN, Korea Institute of Science and Technology Information (KISTI) and Leibniz Supercomputing Centre. Hardware vendors for prototype boards included IBM, SGI, HP, Dell and others.

=== Knights Corner ===
The Knights Corner product line is made at a 22 nm process size, using Intel's Tri-gate technology with more than 50 cores per chip, and is Intel's first many-cores commercial product.

In June 2011, SGI announced a partnership with Intel to use the MIC architecture in its high-performance computing products. In September 2011, it was announced that the Texas Advanced Computing Center (TACC) will use Knights Corner cards in their 10-petaFLOPS "Stampede" supercomputer, providing 8 petaFLOPS of compute power. According to "Stampede: A Comprehensive Petascale Computing Environment" the "second-generation Intel (Knights Landing) MICs will be added when they become available, increasing Stampede's aggregate peak performance to at least 15 PetaFLOPS."

On 15 November 2011, Intel showed an early silicon version of a Knights Corner processor.

On 5 June 2012, Intel released open source software and documentation regarding Knights Corner.

On 18 June 2012, Intel announced at the 2012 Hamburg International Supercomputing Conference that Xeon Phi will be the brand name used for all products based on their Many Integrated Core architecture. In June 2012, Cray announced it would be offering 22 nm "Knight's Corner" chips (branded as "Xeon Phi") as a co-processor in its "Cascade" systems.

In June 2012, ScaleMP announced a virtualization update allowing Xeon Phi as a transparent processor extension, allowing legacy MMX/SSE code to run without code changes. An important component of the Intel Xeon Phi coprocessor's core is its vector processing unit (VPU). The VPU features a novel 512-bit SIMD instruction set, officially known as Intel Initial Many Core Instructions (Intel IMCI). Thus, the VPU can execute 16 single-precision (SP) or 8 double-precision (DP) operations per cycle. The VPU also supports Fused Multiply-Add (FMA) instructions and hence can execute 32 SP or 16 DP floating point operations per cycle. It also provides support for integers. The VPU also features an Extended Math Unit (EMU) that can execute operations such as reciprocal, square root, and logarithm, thereby allowing these operations to be executed in a vector fashion with high bandwidth. The EMU operates by calculating polynomial approximations of these functions.

On 12 November 2012, Intel announced two Xeon Phi coprocessor families using the 22 nm process size: the Xeon Phi 3100 and the Xeon Phi 5110P. The Xeon Phi 3100 will be capable of more than 1 teraFLOPS of double-precision floating-point instructions with 240 GB/s memory bandwidth at 300 W. The Xeon Phi 5110P will be capable of 1.01 teraFLOPS of double-precision floating-point instructions with 320 GB/s memory bandwidth at 225 W. The Xeon Phi 7120P will be capable of 1.2 teraFLOPS of double-precision floating-point instructions with 352 GB/s memory bandwidth at 300 W.

On 17 June 2013, the Tianhe-2 supercomputer was announced by TOP500 as the world's fastest. Tianhe-2 used Intel Ivy Bridge Xeon and Xeon Phi processors to achieve 33.86 petaFLOPS. It was the fastest on the list for two and a half years, lastly in November 2015.

==== Design and programming ====
The cores of Knights Corner are based on a modified version of P54C design, used in the original Pentium. The basis of the Intel MIC architecture is to leverage x86 legacy by creating an x86-compatible multiprocessor architecture that can use existing parallelization software tools. Programming tools include OpenMP, OpenCL, Cilk/Cilk Plus and specialised versions of Intel's Fortran, C++ and math libraries.

Design elements inherited from the Larrabee project include x86 ISA, 4-way SMT per core, 512-bit SIMD units, 32 KB L1 instruction cache, 32 KB L1 data cache, coherent L2 cache (512 KB per core), and ultra-wide ring bus connecting processors and memory.

The Knights Corner 512-bit SIMD instructions share many intrinsic functions with the AVX-512 extension. The instruction set documentation is available from Intel under the extension name of KNC.

Models of Xeon Phi X100 Series
Name	Serial Code	Cores (Threads @ 4× core)	Clock (MHz)		L2 cache	GDDR5 ECC memory			Peak DP compute (GFLOPS)	TDP (W)	Cooling system	Form factor	Released
Name	Serial Code	Cores (Threads @ 4× core)	Base	Turbo	L2 cache	Quantity	Channels	BW GB/s	Peak DP compute (GFLOPS)	TDP (W)	Cooling system	Form factor	Released
Xeon Phi 3110X	SE3110X	61 (244)	1053	–	30.5 MB	6 GB	12	240	1028	300	Bare board	PCIe 2.0 x16 card	November, 2012
Xeon Phi 3110X	SE3110X	61 (244)	1053	–	30.5 MB	8 GB	16	320	1028	300	Bare board	PCIe 2.0 x16 card	November, 2012
Xeon Phi 3120A	SC3120A	57 (228)	1100	–	28.5 MB	6 GB	12	240	1003	300	Fan/heatsink	PCIe 2.0 x16 card	17 June 2013
Xeon Phi 3120P	SC3120P	57 (228)	1100	–	28.5 MB	6 GB	12	240	1003	300	Passive heatsink	PCIe 2.0 x16 card	17 June 2013
Xeon Phi 31S1P	BC31S1P	57 (228)	1100	–	28.5 MB	8 GB	16	320	1003	270	Passive heatsink	PCIe 2.0 x16 card	17 June 2013
Xeon Phi 5110P	SC5110P	60 (240)	1053	–	30.0 MB	8 GB	16	320	1011	225	Passive heatsink	PCIe 2.0 x16 card	12 Nov 2012
Xeon Phi 5120D	SC5120D	60 (240)	1053	-	30.0 MB	8 GB	16	352	1011	245	Bare board	SFF 230-pin card	17 June 2013
Xeon Phi 5120D	BC5120D	60 (240)	1053	-	30.0 MB	8 GB	16	352	1011	245	Bare board	SFF 230-pin card	17 June 2013
Xeon Phi SE10P	SE10P	61 (244)	1100	-	30.5 MB	8 GB	16	352	1074	300	Passive heatsink	PCIe 2.0 x16 card	12 Nov. 2012
Xeon Phi SE10X	SE10X	61 (244)	1100	–	30.5 MB	8 GB	16	352	1074	300	Bare board	PCIe 2.0 x16 card	12 Nov. 2012
Xeon Phi 7110P	SC7110P	61 (244)	1100	1250	30.5 MB	16 GB	16	352	1220	300	Passive heatsink	PCIe 2.0 x16 card	???
Xeon Phi 7110X	SC7110X	61 (244)	1250	???	30.5 MB	16 GB	16	352	1220	300	Bare board	PCIe 2.0 x16 card	???
Xeon Phi 7120A	SC7120A	61 (244)	1238	1333	30.5 MB	16 GB	16	352	1208	300	Fan/heatsink	PCIe 2.0 x16 card	6 April 2014
Xeon Phi 7120D	SC7120D	61 (244)	1238	1333	30.5 MB	16 GB	16	352	1208	270	Bare board	SFF 230-pin card	March ??, 2014
Xeon Phi 7120P	SC7120P	61 (244)	1238	1333	30.5 MB	16 GB	16	352	1208	300	Passive heatsink	PCIe 2.0 x16 card	17 June 2013
Xeon Phi 7120X	SC7120X	61 (244)	1238	1333	30.5 MB	16 GB	16	352	1208	300	Bare board	PCIe 2.0 x16 card	17 June 2013

=== Knights Landing ===
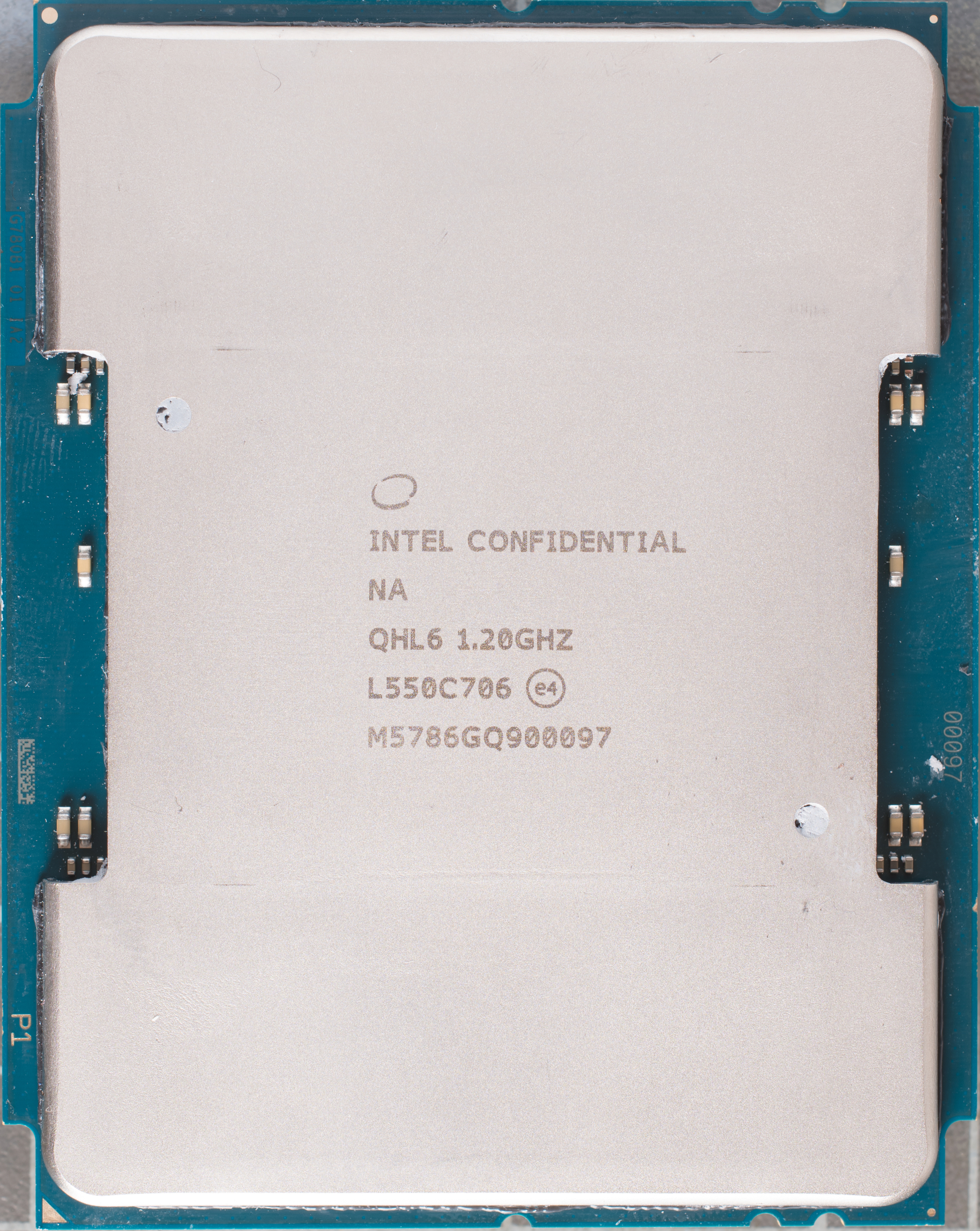
Intel Xeon Phi Knights Landing engineering sample

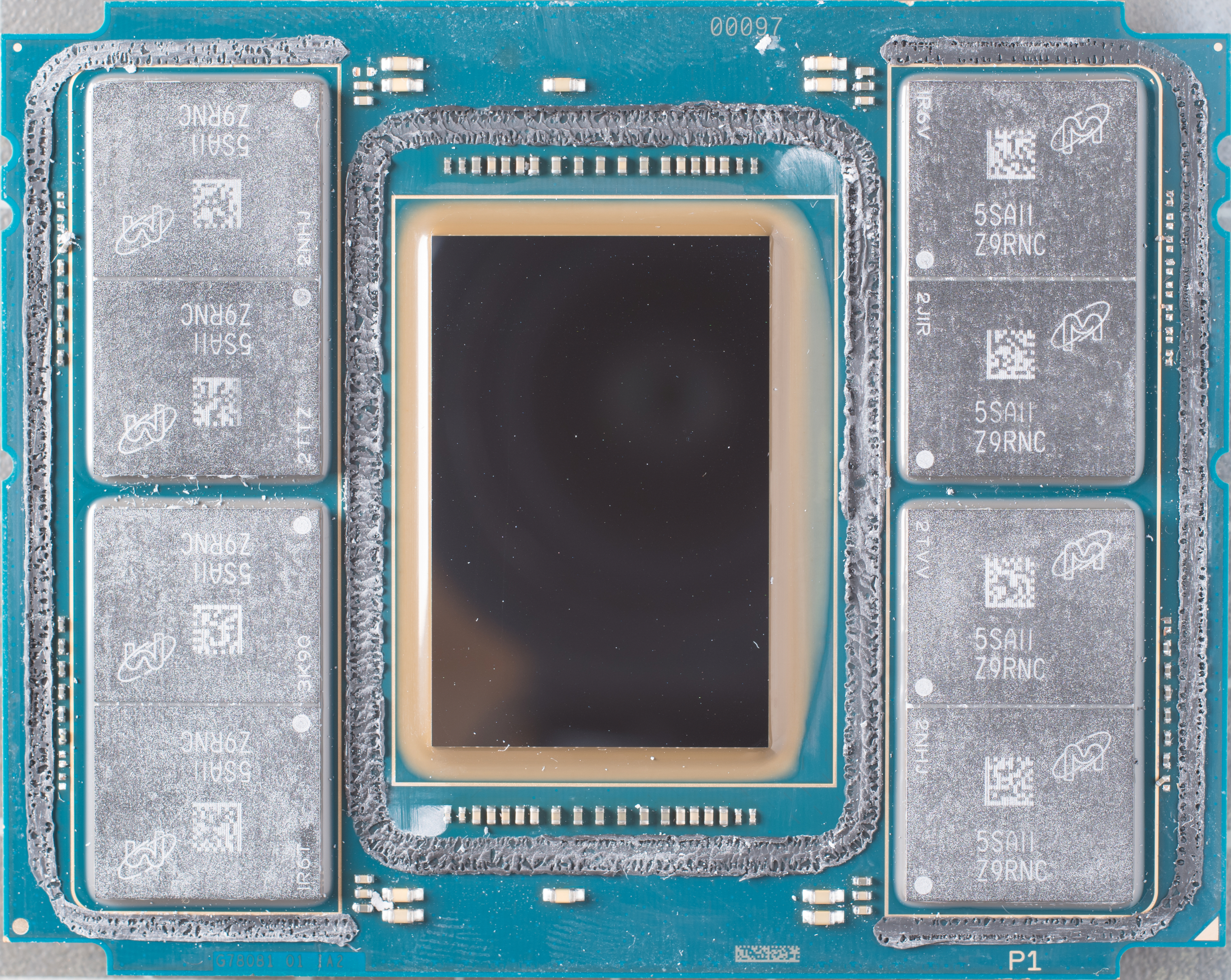
The same processor, delidded

Die shot

Code name for the second-generation MIC architecture product from Intel. Intel officially first revealed details of its second-generation Intel Xeon Phi products on 17 June 2013. Intel said that the next generation of Intel MIC Architecture-based products will be available in two forms, as a coprocessor or a host processor (CPU), and be manufactured using Intel's 14 nm process technology. Knights Landing products will include integrated on-package memory for significantly higher memory bandwidth.

Knights Landing contains up to 72 Airmont (Atom) cores with four threads per core, using LGA 3647 socket supporting up to 384 GB of "far" DDR4 2133 RAM and 8–16 GB of stacked "near" 3D MCDRAM, a version of the Hybrid Memory Cube. Each core has two 512-bit vector units and supports AVX-512 SIMD instructions, specifically the Intel AVX-512 Foundational Instructions (AVX-512F) with Intel AVX-512 Conflict Detection Instructions (AVX-512CD), Intel AVX-512 Exponential and Reciprocal Instructions (AVX-512ER), and Intel AVX-512 Prefetch Instructions (AVX-512PF). Support for IMCI has been removed in favor of AVX-512.

The National Energy Research Scientific Computing Center announced that Phase 2 of its newest supercomputing system "Cori" would use Knights Landing Xeon Phi coprocessors.

On 20 June 2016, Intel launched the Intel Xeon Phi product family x200 based on the Knights Landing architecture, stressing its applicability to not just traditional simulation workloads, but also to machine learning. The model lineup announced at launch included only Xeon Phi of bootable form-factor, but two versions of it: standard processors and processors with integrated Intel Omni-Path architecture fabric. The latter is denoted by the suffix F in the model number. Integrated fabric is expected to provide better latency at a lower cost than discrete high-performance network cards.

On 14 November 2016, the 48th list of TOP500 contained two systems using Knights Landing in the Top 10.

The PCIe based co-processor variant of Knight's Landing was never offered to the general market and was discontinued by August 2017. This included the 7220A, 7240P and 7220P coprocessor cards.

Intel announced they were discontinuing Knights Landing in summer 2018.

==== Models ====
All models can boost to their peak speeds, adding 200 MHz to their base frequency when running just one or two cores. When running from three to the maximum number of cores, the chips can only boost 100 MHz above the base frequency. All chips run high-AVX code at a frequency reduced by 200 MHz.

Models of Xeon Phi X200 Coprocessor Series
Name	Serial Code	Cores (Threads @ 4× core)	Clock (MHz)		L2 cache	MCDRAM memory		DDR4 memory		TDP (W)	Cooling system	Form factor	Released
Name	Serial Code	Cores (Threads @ 4× core)	Base	Turbo	L2 cache	Quantity	BW	Capacity	BW	TDP (W)	Cooling system	Form factor	Released
Xeon Phi 7220A	SC7220A	68 (272)	1200	1400	34 MB	16 GB	400+ GB/s	384 GB	102.4 GB/s	275	Active heatsink	PCIe 3.0 x16 card	???
Xeon Phi 7220P	SC7220P	68 (272)	1200	1400	34 MB	16 GB	400+ GB/s	384 GB	102.4 GB/s	275	Passive heatsink	PCIe 3.0 x16 card	???
Xeon Phi 7240P	SC7240P	68 (272)	1300	1500	34 MB	16 GB	400+ GB/s	384 GB	102.4 GB/s	275	Passive heatsink	PCIe 3.0 x16 card	???

Models of Xeon Phi X200 CPU Series
Xeon Phi 7200 Series	sSpec number	Cores (Threads)	Clock (MHz)		L2 cache	MCDRAM memory		DDR4 memory		Peak DP compute	TDP (W)	Socket	Release date	Part number
Xeon Phi 7200 Series	sSpec number	Cores (Threads)	Base	Turbo	L2 cache	Quantity	BW	Capacity	BW	Peak DP compute	TDP (W)	Socket	Release date	Part number
Xeon Phi 7210	SR2ME (B0)	64 (256)	1300	1500	32 MB	16 GB	400+ GB/s	384 GB	102.4 GB/s	2662; GFLOPS	215	SVLCLGA3647	20 June 2016	HJ8066702859300
Xeon Phi 7210	SR2X4 (B0)	64 (256)	1300	1500	32 MB	16 GB	400+ GB/s	384 GB	102.4 GB/s	2662; GFLOPS	215	SVLCLGA3647	20 June 2016	HJ8066702859300
Xeon Phi 7210F	SR2X5 (B0)	64 (256)	1300	1500	32 MB	16 GB	400+ GB/s	384 GB	102.4 GB/s	2662; GFLOPS	230	SVLCLGA3647	20 June 2016	HJ8066702975000
Xeon Phi 7230	SR2MF (B0)	64 (256)	1300	1500	32 MB	16 GB	400+ GB/s	384 GB	102.4 GB/s	2662; GFLOPS	215	SVLCLGA3647	20 June 2016	HJ8066702859400
Xeon Phi 7230	SR2X3 (B0)	64 (256)	1300	1500	32 MB	16 GB	400+ GB/s	384 GB	102.4 GB/s	2662; GFLOPS	215	SVLCLGA3647	20 June 2016	HJ8066702859400
Xeon Phi 7230F	SR2X2 (B0)	64 (256)	1300	1500	32 MB	16 GB	400+ GB/s	384 GB	102.4 GB/s	2662; GFLOPS	230	SVLCLGA3647	20 June 2016	HJ8066702269002
Xeon Phi 7250	SR2MD (B0)	68 (272)	1400	1600	34 MB	16 GB	400+ GB/s	384 GB	102.4 GB/s	3046; GFLOPS	215	SVLCLGA3647	20 June 2016	HJ8066702859200
Xeon Phi 7250	SR2X1 (B0)	68 (272)	1400	1600	34 MB	16 GB	400+ GB/s	384 GB	102.4 GB/s	3046; GFLOPS	215	SVLCLGA3647	20 June 2016	HJ8066702859200
Xeon Phi 7250F	SR2X0 (B0)	68 (272)	1400	1600	34 MB	16 GB	400+ GB/s	384 GB	102.4 GB/s	3046; GFLOPS	230	SVLCLGA3647	20 June 2016	HJ8066702268900
Xeon Phi 7290	SR2WY (B0)	72 (288)	1500	1700	36 MB	16 GB	400+ GB/s	384 GB	102.4 GB/s	3456; GFLOPS	245	SVLCLGA3647	20 June 2016	HJ8066702974700
Xeon Phi 7290F	SR2WZ (B0)	72 (288)	1500	1700	36 MB	16 GB	400+ GB/s	384 GB	102.4 GB/s	3456; GFLOPS	260	SVLCLGA3647	20 June 2016	HJ8066702975200

=== Knights Mill ===
Knights Mill is Intel's codename for a Xeon Phi product specialized in deep learning, initially released in December 2017. Nearly identical in specifications to Knights Landing, Knights Mill includes optimizations for better utilization of AVX-512 instructions. Single-precision and variable-precision floating-point performance increased, at the expense of double-precision floating-point performance.

==== Models ====
Models of Xeon Phi X205 CPU Series
Xeon Phi 72x5 Series	sSpec number	Cores (Threads)	Clock (MHz)		L2 cache	MCDRAM memory		DDR4 memory		Peak DP compute	TDP (W)	Socket	Release date	Part number
Xeon Phi 72x5 Series	sSpec number	Cores (Threads)	Base	Turbo	L2 cache	Quantity	BW	Capacity	BW	Peak DP compute	TDP (W)	Socket	Release date	Part number
Xeon Phi 7235	SR3VF (A0)	64 (256)	1300	1400	32 MB	16 GB	400+ GB/s	384 GB	102.4 GB/s	TBA	250	SVLCLGA3647	Q4 2017	HJ8068303823900
Xeon Phi 7255	SR3VG (A0)	68 (272)	1100	1200	34 MB	16 GB	400+ GB/s	384 GB	115.2 GB/s	TBA	215	SVLCLGA3647	Q4 2017	HJ8068303826300
Xeon Phi 7285	SR3VE (A0)	68 (272)	1300	1400	34 MB	16 GB	400+ GB/s	384 GB	115.2 GB/s	TBA	250	SVLCLGA3647	Q4 2017	HJ8068303823800
Xeon Phi 7295	SR3VD (A0)	72 (288)	1500	1600	36 MB	16 GB	400+ GB/s	384 GB	115.2 GB/s	TBA	320	SVLCLGA3647	Q4 2017	HJ8068303823700

=== Knights Hill ===
Knights Hill was the codename for the third-generation MIC architecture, for which Intel announced the first details at SC14. It was to be manufactured in a 10 nm process.

Knights Hill was expected to be used in the United States Department of Energy Aurora supercomputer, to be deployed at Argonne National Laboratory. However, Aurora was delayed in favor of using an "advanced architecture" with a focus on machine learning.

In 2017, Intel announced that Knights Hill had been canceled in favor of another architecture built from the ground up to enable Exascale computing in the future. This new architecture was expected for 2020–2021; however, this was also cancelled due to the discontinuation of the Xeon Phi.

== Programming ==
One performance and programmability study reported that achieving high performance with Xeon Phi still needs help from programmers and that merely relying on compilers with traditional programming models is insufficient. Other studies in various domains, such as life sciences and deep learning, have shown that exploiting the thread- and SIMD-parallelism of Xeon Phi achieves significant speed-ups.

== Competitors ==
- Nvidia Tesla, a direct competitor in the HPC market
- AMD Radeon Pro and AMD Radeon Instinct direct competitors in the HPC market

== See also ==
- Texas Advanced Computing Center – "Stampede" supercomputer incorporates Xeon Phi chips. Stampede is capable of 10 petaFLOPS.
- AVX-512
- Cell (microprocessor)
- Intel Tera-Scale
- Massively parallel
- Xeon
