= SCC =

SCC may refer to:

== Companies ==
- Secure Computing Corporation
- SCC (Specialist Computer Centres), British-based IT consulting company
- Southern Copper Corporation, a mining company operating in Central and South America

== Computing ==
- Source code control, in a Source Code Control System
- Scenarist Closed captioning file
- Small, Cheap Computer, a small, subnotebook computer
- Source Control Plug-in API, also known as SCC API or Microsoft Source Code Control Interface (MSSCCI)
- Serial Communication Controller
- Single-chip Cloud Computer, Intel's 48-core research chip
- Strongly connected component in graph theory

== Events ==
- Southern Comfort Conference, an annual transgender conference

== Medicine ==
- Sickle cell crisis, an episode of pain in sickle-cell disease
- Short-course chemotherapy, chemotherapy of short duration
- Small-cell carcinoma, a form of cancer that most commonly arises in the lung
- Somatic cell count, a count of cells, usually to detect mastitis and thus to assess milk quality
- Squamous-cell carcinoma, a form of cancer in squamous epithelial cells
- Spinal cord compression, undue compressive force on the spinal cord
- SCCmec, staphylococcal cassette chromosome mec
- Subgenual cingulate cortex, that is, Brodmann area 25, a part of the brain in primates
- Superior semicircular canal, one of three semicircular canals in the vestibular system, within the inner ear
- Succinylcholine

== Military ==
- Somaliland Camel Corps, British Army unit

== Organisations ==
- Special Criminal Court, Ireland
- Sierra Club Canada
- Singapore Cricket Club
- Singapore Cruise Centre
- Society of Cosmetic Chemists, US
- Standards Council of Canada
- Swiss Cancer Centre, in Lausanne
- Students for Concealed Carry (of firearms), US
- Society of Cannabis Clinicians
- Society of Cosmetic Chemists
- Sea cadets
  - Sea Cadets (United Kingdom)
    - Bermuda Sea Cadet Corps
  - Hong Kong Sea Cadet Corps
  - New Zealand Sea Cadet Corps

== Politics and government ==
=== United Kingdom ===
- Scottish Constitutional Convention
- Sheffield City Council, England
- Shropshire County Council, England
- Somerset County Council, England
- Southampton City Council, England
- Staffordshire County Council, England
- Suffolk County Council, England
- Surrey County Council, England
- Swansea City Council, Wales

=== Other ===
- State Corporation Commission (Virginia), American regulatory agency
- Supreme Court of Canada, highest and final court of appeal in Canada
- Santa Clara County, California, a county government in California
- Sligo County Council, the local government for County Sligo
- Small claims court, a legal court with limited jurisdiction

== Schools and colleges ==
- Sacramento City College, in Sacramento, California, United States
- Saint Columban College, in Pagadian City, Philippines
- Salem Community College, in Carneys Point, New Jersey, United States
- Sampson Community College, in Clinton, North Carolina, United States
- Sandhills Community College, in Pinehurst, North Carolina, United States
- Santiago Canyon College, in Orange, California, United States
- Scottish Church College, an undergraduate college in Kolkata, India
- Scottsdale Community College, in Scottsdale, Arizona, United States
- Seminole Community College, in Sanford, Florida, United States
- Seton Catholic Central High School, A high school in Binghamton, New York, United States
- Sinclair Community College, in Dayton, Ohio, United States
- Shawnee Community College, in Ullin, Illinois, United States
- Sherman College of Chiropractic, in Spartanburg, South Carolina
- Solano Community College, in Fairfield, California, United States
- Somerset Community College in Somerset, Kentucky, United States
- South Cheshire College, in Crewe, Cheshire, England
- Southeast Community College, in southeastern Nebraska, United States
- Southeastern Community College (disambiguation)
- Southwestern Community College (disambiguation)
- Southern Christian College, in Kingston, Tasmania, Australia
- Southern Cross College, a Christian college in Sydney, Australia
- Spartanburg Community College in Spartanburg, South Carolina, United States
- Spokane Community College, in Spokane, Washington, United States
- St. Charles Community College, in Cottleville, Missouri, United States
- St. Charles College, Pietermaritzburg, in Pietermaritzburg, KZN, South Africa
- Stanly Community College, in Albemarle, North Carolina, United States
- Salesian College Celbridge, in Celbridge, Co. Kildare, Ireland

== Sports ==
- Suncoast Conference
- South Central Conference (disambiguation)
- South Coast Conference (disambiguation)
- Southern California Conference (junior college), junior college athletic conference

== Other ==
- Saab Car Computer; see Saab Information Display
- Deadhorse Airport, Alaska (USFAA/IATA code)
- Seattle Center Coliseum
- Self-consolidating concrete
- Social cost of carbon
- Somerset Coal Canal
- Sport compact car, a classification of automobile
- Star Chinese Channel
- Stress corrosion cracking
- Saguaro Correctional Center, a US prison
- Silesia City Center
- Standard contractual clauses, in General Data Protection Regulation
- Stop Cop City, an Atlanta, Georgia, United States-based movement opposing a local police training facility
