= Terascale =

In computing, terascale may refer to

- Intel Tera-Scale
- AMD TeraScale (microarchitecture)

== See also ==
- Petascale computing
