= La Seu =

La Seu may refer to:

== Churches ==
France

- La Seu de Perpinyà, the cathedral of Saint John the Baptist in Perpignan

Italy

- La Seu de l'Alguer, the cathedral of Alghero on the island of Sardinia

Spain

- La Seu d'Alacant, the San Nicolas cathedral in Alicante
- La Seu de Barcelona, the cathedral of the Holy Cross and Saint Eulalia in Barcelona
- La Seu de Castelló, the co-cathedral of Saint Mary in Castellón de la Plana
- La Seu d'Eivissa, the Ibiza Cathedral
- La Seu de Girona, the cathedral of Saint Mary of Girona
- La Seu Nova de Lleida, the present Saint John the Baptist cathedral of the city of Lleida
- La Seu Vella, Lleida, the former Saint Mary cathedral of the city of Lleida
- La Seu de Mallorca, the cathedral of Saint Mary of Palma de Mallorca
- La Seu de Manresa, the Collegiate Basilica of Saint Mary in Manresa
- La Seu de Menorca, the Minorca Cathedral
- La Seu d'Oriola, the Orihuela Cathedral
- La Seu de Sant Feliu de Llobregat, the Sant Feliu de Llobregat Cathedral
- La Seu de Sogorb, the Segorbe Cathedral
- La Seu de Solsona, the cathedral of Saint Mary of Solsona
- La Seu de Tarragona, the Tarragona Cathedral
- La Seu de Terrassa, the cathedral of the Holy Spirit of Terrassa
- La Seu de Tortosa, the Tortosa Cathedral
- La Seu de València, the Valencia Cathedral
- La Seu de Vic, the cathedral of Saint Peter of Vic
- La Seu d'Urgell, the cathedral of Saint Mary of Urgell
- La Seu de Xàtiva, the Collegiate Basilica of Xàtiva

== Other uses ==
- La Seu d'Urgell, town in the Catalan Pyrenees of Spain

== See also ==
- La Seo, cathedral in Zaragoza, Spain
- Seu (disambiguation)
