= Southeast University (disambiguation) =

Southeast University is a public university in Nanjing, Jiangsu, China.

Southeast University may also refer to:

- National Southeast University, now Nanjing University, in Nanjing, Jiangsu, China
- Southeast University (Bangladesh), a university in Dhaka, Bangladesh

== See also ==
- Southeastern University (disambiguation)
- Southeast College, a publicly funded regional college with six campuses in the province of Saskatchewan, Canada
