= SC2 =

SC2 may refer to:

== Film ==
- Santa Clause 2, the 2002 sequel to the original Santa Clause film
- Short Circuit 2, a 1988 American film

== Military ==
- USS SC-2, a U.S. Navy submarine chaser commissioned in 1918 and sold in 1930
- Convoy SC 2, an Allied trade convoy that was attacked during the Second World War
- SC-2 radar, an American-made radar used during World War II by the U.S. Navy

== Transportation ==
- South Carolina Highway 2, a state route in Cayce, South Carolina
- Saturn SC2, a compact sport coupe car

== Video games ==
- SimCity 2000, a city-building game
- Soulcalibur II, a fighting game for several video game consoles
- Tom Clancy's Splinter Cell: Pandora Tomorrow, previously called Splinter Cell 2
- Star Control II, a science fiction computer game
- StarCraft II, a real-time strategy game by Blizzard Entertainment
- Supreme Commander 2, a real-time strategy video game

== Other uses ==
- South Carolina's 2nd congressional district
- ISO/IEC JTC 1/SC 2, standardization subcommittee for coded character sets
- SC2 (leisure complex), in Rhyl, Wales, UK
- SC02, a FIPS 10-4 region code, see List of FIPS region codes (S–U)
- SC-02, a subdivision code for the Seychelles, see ISO 3166-2:SC
- SC-02, a speech synthesizer by Votrax
- Steam Controller (2nd generation), gamepad by Valve Corporation

== See also ==
- SCC (disambiguation)
- SCSC (disambiguation)
