= Sant Feliu de Llobregat =

- Municipality
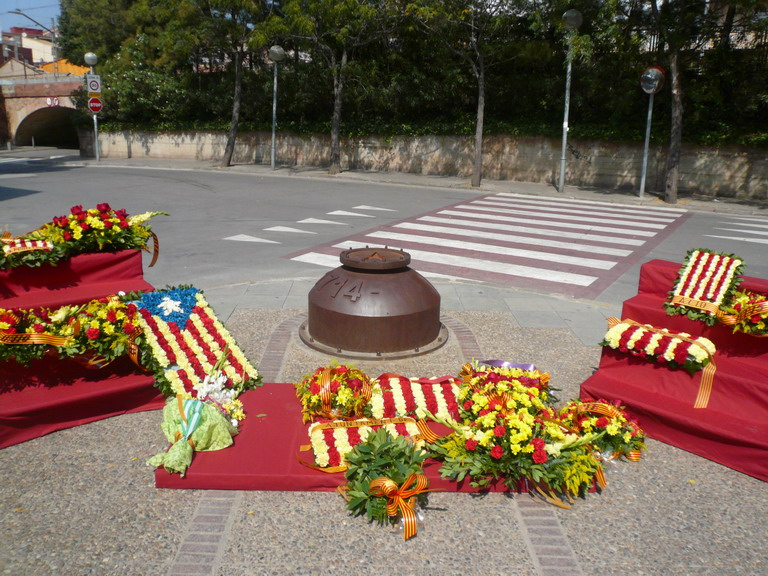
- 11 September (1714) monument

- Flag Coat of arms

- Location in Catalonia Sant Feliu de Llobregat (Spain)
- Coordinates: 41°23′00″N 2°02′38″E
- Country: Spain
- Community: Catalonia
- Province: Barcelona
- Comarca: Baix Llobregat

Government
  - mayor: Jordi San José Buenaventura (2015)

Area
  - Total: 11.8 km^{2} (4.6 sq mi)
- Elevation: 25 m (82 ft)

Population (2025-01-01)
  - Total: 46,781
  - Density: 3,960/km^{2} (10,300/sq mi)
- Demonym: Sanfeliuenc
- Climate: Csa
- Website: santfeliu.cat

Sant Feliu de Llobregat (Catalan: [ˈsaɱ fəˈliw ðə ʎuβɾəˈɣat]) is an industrial city and municipality in Catalonia, Spain, in the province of Barcelona. It is the capital of the comarca of Baix Llobregat, and the see of a bishopric since June 2005.

== Geography ==
Sant Feliu is situated in the valley of the river Llobregat, and goes up to Parc de Collserola. The closest mountains to the city, which belong to the Serra de Collserola, are the Puig d'Olorda (436.4 m), the Penya del Moro (375 m), the Puig Aguilar (387 m) and the Puig Sant Pere Màrtir (389 m). The Riera de la Salut flows from the mountains through the city and ends in the Llobregat river, it is usually dry as it only carries water after heavy rain.

== Festivals ==
- August 10 is Saint Lawrence's Day (Sant Llorenç), the patron saint of Sant Feliu.
- The Festa de la Tardor (Autumn Festival) is in October.
- The Festa de Primavera (Spring Festival), also known as Festa de la Rosa (Festival of the Rose) because of the National Rose Show, is held every year in May. The Industrial Trade Show is held at the same time.
- Commonly known as "El Buti", Butifarrasound is a music festival celebrated every year on 8 May.

== Notable people ==
- Pedro Dot i Martínez (28 March 1885 – 12 November 1976), most famous of Spanish rose breeders.
- Joana Raspall i Juanola (Barcelona, 1 July 1913 – Sant Feliu de Llobregat, 4 December 2013), poet and novelist writing in Catalan.
- Juan Carlos Navarro (13 June 1980 – ), basketball captain for Spain.
- OBK (Jordi Sànchez, Miguel Arjona, both born 1968), technopop musical group.
- Mireia Lalaguna (born 28 November 1992), first Spaniard crowned Miss World.
- Jordi Hurtado (born 16 June 1957), television presenter of program "Saber y Ganar" on channel La2.

== History ==
Paleolithic remains found in the Can Albareda area show a prehistoric human presence. Iberian and Roman traces remain, for instance in the town square.

In Roman times and during part of the Middle Ages, the place was called Titian and Micano Tiano. The name Sant Feliu does not appear until 1002 in a document in the monastery of Sant Cugat del Vallès. The name originally applied to a chapel dedicated to Saint Feliu (Catalan for Felix). The church of Sant Llorenç (Catalan for Lawrence) was built in 1524 (destroyed in the Civil War and since rebuilt). Until then, Sant Feliu depended on the parishes of Sant Just Desvern and Sant Joan Despí.

In the seventeenth century, Jaime Falguera built a palace in the town, with extensive grounds stretching to the river Llobregat. Until recently the property remained in the family of the Marquis of Castellbell, noble descendants of Falguera, and the palace was used into the twentieth century. Today the municipality owns the palace and what is left of the gardens. The National Rose Show is held there each May. The stables preserve a carriage of the Castellbell family.

In 1855 a railway line was built linking Barcelona and Vilafranca with a station at Sant Feliu. The town market was built in 1885.

Steam-driven textile factories came early to the town: Bertrand (1861) and Solà and Sert (1893) are the most important firms today. But the heavy industrialisation of the town and its region came with the twentieth century introduction of electricity.

Rose growing has been an important industry in Sant Feliu since the beginning of the twentieth century.

King Alfonso XIII made Sant Feliu a city in 1929 and in 1936 it became the capital of Baix Llobregat.

During the Civil War place names with monarchist or religious meaning were removed. The people of Sant Feliu became "Roses del Llobregat" in acknowledgement of the history of rose growing in the area by such families as Dot and Camprubí. Nationalist forces occupied the Barcelona area in February 1939.

In 1948 the Falange set up San Feliu Youth Radio, which despite its origins came to enjoy a certain independence. After a brief crisis it reopened in 1981 as Ràdio Sant Feliu.

In 1999 a new Dot and Camprubí Rose Garden was planted to celebrate the work of Pedro Dot and other Spanish rose breeders. It has 20,000 roses and more than 400 varieties.

In 2005, Pope John Paul II appointed the Archbishop of Barcelona metropolitan of the province and separated off two new dioceses, making Sant Feliu a bishopric and Sant Llorenç a cathedral.

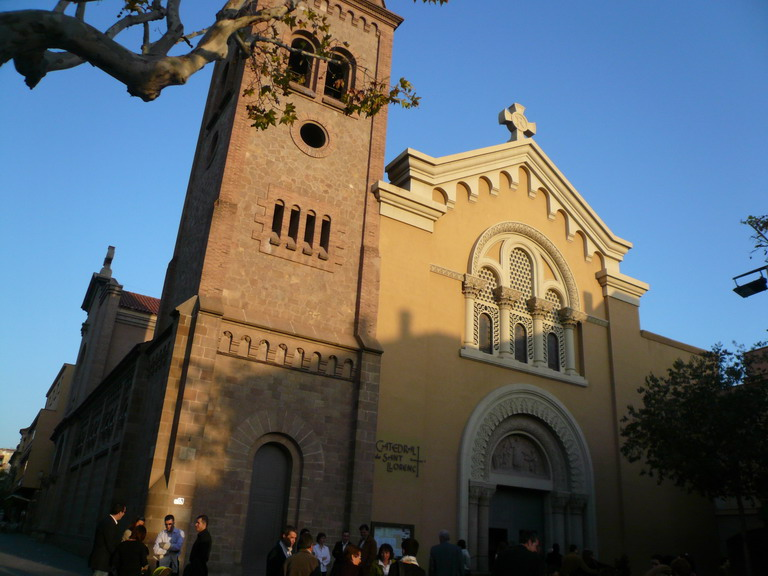
The ancient church of Saint Lawrence, built in 1524, rebuilt after the Civil War and since 2005 a cathedral.
