= Diocese of Sant Feliu de Llobregat =

Roman Catholic diocese in Spain

Coordinates: 41.3808°N 2.04611°E

Diocese of Sant Feliu de Llobregat Dioecesis Sancti Felicis de Llobregat Diócesis de San Feliú de Llobregat (es) Diòcesi de Sant Feliu de Llobregat (ca)

Catholic
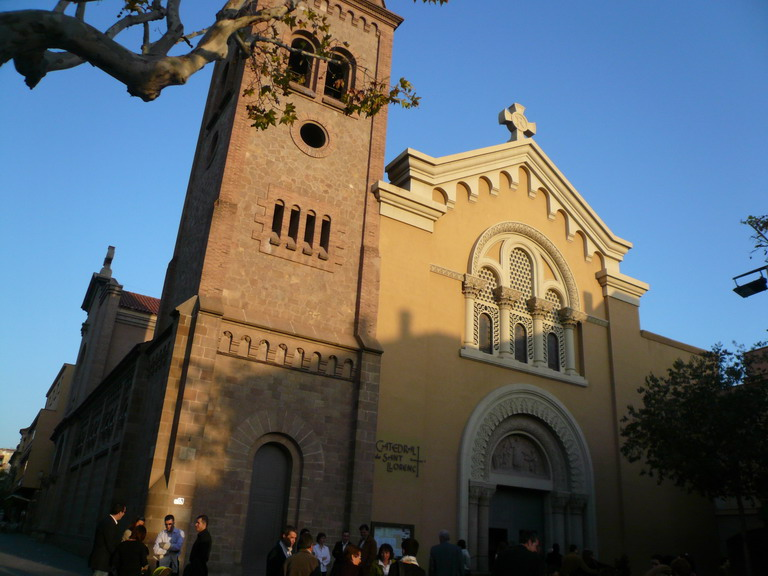
- Sant Feliu de Llobregat Cathedral

Location
- Country: Spain
- Ecclesiastical province: Barcelona
- Metropolitan: Barcelona

Statistics
- Area: 1,400 km^{2} (540 sq mi)
- Population: Total; Catholics: (as of 2004); 661,393; 600,000 (90.7%)

Information
- Rite: Latin Rite
- Cathedral: St Lawrence's Cathedral in San Feliú de Llobregat

Current leadership
- Pope: Leo XIV
- Bishop: Zabier Gómez García OP
- Metropolitan Archbishop: Lluís Martínez Sistach

Website
- Website of the Diocese

The Diocese of Sant Feliu de Llobregat (Latin: Dioecesis Sancti Felicis de Llobregat) is a Latin diocese of the Catholic Church located in the city of Sant Feliu de Llobregat in the ecclesiastical province of Barcelona in Spain.

== History ==
- 15 June 2004: Established as Diocese of Sant Feliu de Llobregat from the Metropolitan Archdiocese of Barcelona

== Special churches ==
- Minor Basilica, National Shrine:
  - Basílica de Mare de Déu de Montserrat, Montserrat, Catalonia
- Minor Basilica:
  - Basílica de Santa Maria, Vilafranca del Penedès, Catalonia

== Leadership ==
- Agustín Cortés Soriano (15 June 2004 – 8 October 2024)
- Zabier Gómez García, O.P. (8 October 2024 – present)

== See also ==
- Roman Catholicism in Spain

== Sources ==
- GCatholic.org
- Catholic Hierarchy
- Diocese website (in Catalan)
