= Joana Raspall i Juanola =

Catalan writer and librarian

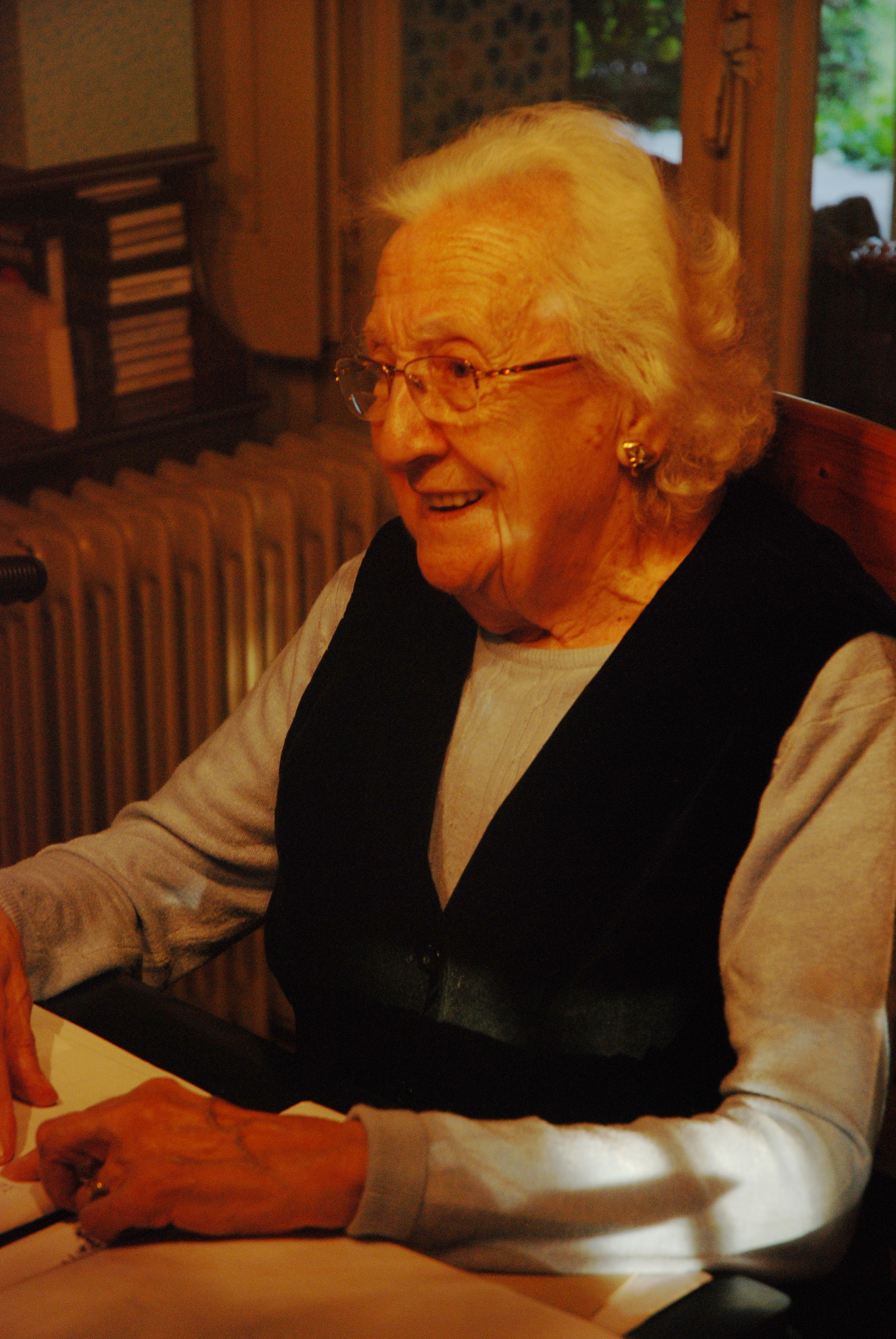
Joana Raspall

Joana Raspall i Juanola (1 July 1913 – 4 December 2013) was a Spanish writer and librarian. She was born in Barcelona and died in Sant Feliu de Llobregat.

== Selected works ==
=== Poetry ===
- Petits poemes per a nois i noies (1981)
- Ales i camins (1991)
- Llum i gira-sols (1994)
- Bon dia, poesia (1996)
- Degotall de poemes (1997)
- Com el plomissol (1998)
- Pinzellades en vers (1998)
- Versos amics (1998)
- Escaleta al vent (2002)
- Font de versos (2003)
- Serpentines de versos (2000)
- A compàs dels versos (2003)
- Concert de poesia (2004)
- Arpegis, haikús (2004)
- Instants haikus i tankes (2009)
- El jardí vivent (2010)
- El meu món de poesia (2011)
- Batecs de paraules (2013)
- 46 poemes i 2 contes (2013)
- Joana de les paraules clares (2013)
- Divuit poemes de Nadal i un de Cap d'any (2013)
- Nou Poemes per a tot l'any (2013)
- A world of poetry! (Aplicació dispositius IOS a AppStore i Android a GooglePlay, versió anglesa)

=== Novels and short stories ===
- El mal vent (1994)
- Contes del si és no és (1994)
- La corona i l'àliga (1997)
- Contes increïbles (1999)
- La trampa de la urbanització K (2000)
