= Teraflops Research Chip =

General information
- Launched: 2006
- Designed by: Intel Tera-Scale Computing Research Program

Performance
- Max. CPU clock rate: 5.67 GHz
- Data width: 38-bit

Physical specifications
- Transistors: 100,000,000
- Cores: 80
- Socket: custom 1248-pin LGA (343 signal pins)

Architecture and classification
- Instruction set: 96-bit VLIW

History
- Successor: Xeon Phi

Intel Teraflops Research Chip (codenamed Polaris) is a research manycore processor containing 80 cores, using a network-on-chip architecture, developed by Intel's Tera-Scale Computing Research Program. It was manufactured using a 65 nm CMOS process with eight layers of copper interconnect and contains 100 million transistors on a 275 mm^{2} die. Its design goal was to demonstrate a modular architecture capable of a sustained performance of 1.0 TFLOPS while dissipating less than 100 W. Research from the project was later incorporated into Xeon Phi. The technical lead of the project was Sriram R. Vangal.

The processor was initially presented at the Intel Developer Forum on September 26, 2006 and officially announced on February 11, 2007. A working chip was presented at the 2007 IEEE International Solid-State Circuits Conference, alongside technical specifications.

== Architecture ==
The chip consists of a 10x8 2D mesh network of cores and nominally operates at 4 GHz. (Note: Though the chip was later shown by Intel to run as high as 5.67 GHz.) Each core, called a tile (3 mm^{2}), contains a processing engine and a 5-port wormhole-switched router (0.34 mm^{2}) with mesochronous interfaces, with a bandwidth of 80 GB/s and latency of 1.25 ns at 4 GHz. The processing engine in each tile contains two independent, 9-stage pipeline, single-precision floating-point multiplyaccumulator (FPMAC) units, 3 KB of single-cycle instruction memory and 2 KB of data memory. Each FPMAC unit is capable of performing 2 single-precision floating-point operations per cycle. Each tile has thus an estimated peak performance of 16 GFLOPS at the standard configuration of 4 GHz. A 96-bit very long instruction word (VLIW) encodes up to eight operations per cycle. The custom instruction set includes instructions to send and receive packets into/from the chip's network and well as instructions for sleeping and waking a particular tile. Underneath each tile, a 256 KB SRAM module (codenamed Freya) was 3D stacked, thus bringing memory nearer to the processor to increase overall memory bandwidth to 1 TB/s, at the expense of higher cost, thermal stress and latency, and a small total capacity of 20 MB. The network of Polaris was shown to have a bisection bandwidth of 1.6 Tbit/s at 3.16 GHz and 2.92 Tbit/s at 5.67 GHz.

Teraflops Research Chip's tile diagram

Other prominent features of the Teraflops Research chip include its fine-grained power management with 21 independent sleep regions on a tile and dynamic tile sleep, and very high energy efficiency with 27 GFLOPS/W theoretical peak at 0.6 V and 19.4 GFLOPS/W actual for stencil at 0.75 V.

Instruction types and their latency
Instruction type	Latency (cycles)
FPMAC	9
LOAD/STORE	2
SEND/RECEIVE	2
JUMP/BRANCH	1
STALL/WFD	?
SLEEP/WAKE	6

Application performance of Teraflops Research Chip (Note: At 1.07 V and 4.27 GHz.)
Application	$FLOP$ count	$\text{TFLOPS}_{avg}$	$\% \text{TFLOPS}_{peak}$	Active tiles
Stencil	358K	1.00	73.3%	80
SGEMM: Matrix multiplication	2.63M	0.51	37.5%	80
Spreadsheet	64.2K	0.45	33.2%	80
2D FFT	196K	0.02	2.73%	64

Experimental results of the Teraflops Research Chip (Note: All measurements present performance with all 80 cores active.)
$V_{CC}$	$f_{max}$ (Note: Substantially higher frequencies at the same voltages (compared to the initial ISSCC report) were attained in 2008 with use of a custom cooling solution.)	$\text{TFLOPS}_{peak}$ (Note: Values in italic were extrapolated by $\text{FLOPS}_{peak} = f_{max} \cdot 80 \text{ tiles} \cdot 2 \tfrac{\text{FPMAC}}{\text{tile}} \cdot 2 \tfrac{\text{FLOPS}}{\text{FPMAC}\cdot\text{cycle}}$, where the maximal frequency was manually extracted from plots and are thus only approximate in their nature.)	Power (Note: Values in italic were manually extracted from plots and are thus only approximate in their nature.)	$T$	Source
0.60 V	1.0 GHz	0.32 TFLOPS	11 W	110 °C	
0.675 V	1.0 GHz	0.32 TFLOPS	15.6 W	80 °C	
0.70 V	1.5 GHz	0.48 TFLOPS	25 W	110 °C	
0.70 V	1.35 GHz	0.43 TFLOPS	18 W	80 °C	
0.75 V	1.6 GHz	0.51 TFLOPS	21 W	80 °C	
0.80 V	2.1 GHz	0.67 TFLOPS	42 W	110 °C	
0.80 V	2.0 GHz	0.64 TFLOPS	26 W	80 °C	
0.85 V	2.4 GHz	0.77 TFLOPS	32 W	80 °C	
0.90 V	2.6 GHz	0.83 TFLOPS	70 W	110 °C	
0.90 V	2.85 GHz	0.91 TFLOPS	45 W	80 °C	
0.95 V	3.16 GHz	1.0 TFLOPS	62 W	80 °C	
1.00 V	3.13 GHz	1.0 TFLOPS	98 W	110 °C	
1.00 V	3.8 GHz	1.22 TFLOPS	78 W	80 °C	
1.05 V	4.2 GHz	1.34 TFLOPS	82 W	80 °C	
1.10 V	3.5 GHz	1.12 TFLOPS	135 W	110 °C	
1.10 V	4.5 GHz	1.44 TFLOPS	105 W	80 °C	
1.15 V	4.8 GHz	1.54 TFLOPS	128 W	80 °C	
1.20 V	4.0 GHz	1.28 TFLOPS	181 W	110 °C	
1.20 V	5.1 GHz	1.63 TFLOPS	152 W	80 °C	
1.25 V	5.3 GHz	1.70 TFLOPS	165 W	80 °C	
1.30 V	4.4 GHz	1.39 TFLOPS	?	110 °C	
1.30 V	5.5 GHz	1.76 TFLOPS	210 W	80 °C	
1.35 V	5.67 GHz	1.81 TFLOPS	230 W	80 °C	
1.40 V	4.8 GHz	1.52 TFLOPS	?	110 °C	

== Issues ==
Intel aimed to help software development for the new exotic architecture by creating a new programming model, especially for the chip, called Ct. The model never gained the following Intel hoped for and has been eventually incorporated into Intel Array Building Blocks, a now defunct C++ library.

== See also ==
- Single-chip Cloud Computer
- Xeon Phi
