= SCSC =

SCSC is an acronym which may refer to:

- Safety-Critical Systems Club the UK's professional network for sharing knowledge about safety-critical systems
- Santa Clara Swim Club, a youth swim team in Santa Clara, CA.
- Sheffield City Swimming Club, a swimming club based in Sheffield
- Standing Council of Scottish Chiefs, an organization composed of the chiefs of many Scottish clans
- State Civil Service Commission
- Superconducting Super Collider, a cancelled particle accelerator
- South Carolina State College, the old name of South Carolina State University
- Scarborough Campus Students' Union, formerly known as the Scarborough Campus Students' Council (SCSC)

== See also ==
- SC2 (disambiguation)
- SC (disambiguation)
