= Southeastern College (disambiguation) =

Southeastern College is a private college in Florida.

Southeastern College may also refer to:

- The College at Southeastern, a private Baptist college located in Wake Forest, North Carolina
- Southeastern Baptist College, a private Baptist college in Laurel, Mississippi
- Southeastern Bible College, a defunct private Christian college in Birmingham, Alabama
- Southeastern Christian College, a defunct liberal arts college in Winchester, Kentucky
- Southeastern Free Will Baptist College, a private Free Will Baptist college in Wendell, North Carolina
- Southeastern Community College (Iowa), a public community college in West Burlington, Iowa
- Southeastern Community College (North Carolina), a public community college in Whiteville, North Carolina
- Southeastern Illinois College, a public community college in Saline County, Illinois
- Southeastern Technical College, a public community college in Vidalia, Georgia

== See also ==
- Southeast College, a publicly funded regional college with six campuses in the province of Saskatchewan, Canada
- Southeastern University (disambiguation)
