= South Coast Conference =

South Coast Conference may refer to:

- South Coast Conference (California), a junior college athletic conference in California
- South Coast Conference (Massachusetts), a high school athletic conference in Massachusetts
