= Sustainable Energy Utility =

Sustainable Energy Utility (SEU) is a community-based model of development founded on energy conservation and the use of renewables, seeking to permanently decrease the use of source materials, water, and energy. The model prescribes the creation of independent and financially self-sufficient non-profit entities for energy sustainability through conservation, efficiency, and end-user based decentralized renewable energy. The intent of SEU is to address concerns about climate change, rising energy prices, inequity of energy availability, and a lack of community governance of energy development. The SEU model was developed by Dr. J. Byrne at the Center for Energy and Environmental Policy, University of Delaware. The Foundation for Renewable Energy and Environment (FREE) is implementing versions of the model.

In the U.S., the SEU model was first implemented by the State of Delaware, followed by the District of Columbia, Sonoma County in California, the California Statewide Communities Development Authority (CSCDA), and the Pennsylvania Sustainable Energy Finance program, which is a partnership initiative between Pennsylvania Treasury and FREE. The SEU model is recognized by the U.S. White House, the Asian Development Bank, and the International Energy Agency as a viable platform to spur sustainable energy investment while driving local economic development.

== History of the SEU Model ==
The SEU model was a result of efforts by Dr. J. Byrne to realize a model of energy-environment-society relations which could reflect Amory Lovins’ promise of the negawatt and the philosophical tenets of Amulya K. N. Reddy's DEFENDUS. While working as an author with the Intergovernmental Panel on Climate Change, Byrne was influenced by the philosophical framework of the discourse on political ecology and environmental justice. He and his team worked on calculating the amount of greenhouse gas emissions which eliminate climate change, leading to an energy-sustainable future. Their study concluded that a target of 3.3 tons of emissions per capita per year would be sustainable emissions. In response to this finding, Byrne's team worked on designing an energy system model that would use a commonwealth economy and community trusts to achieve this goal; the result was the SEU.

== Principles ==
=== Paradigm shift ===
The SEU aims to achieve a four-fold paradigm shift:

- from carbon-intensive energy sources to carbon free energy sources,
- from viewing energy as a commodity to viewing energy as a service provision,
- from supply oriented energy architecture to demand oriented energy architecture, and
- from a centralized energy system to a more distributed energy infrastructure.

To achieve this paradigm shift, the model is guided by three main principles: establishing civil society based energy governance, increasing reliance on savings and environmental benefits of SEU investments to build out a sustainable energy future, and continued evaluation of performance determined by environmental factors, affordability, and local economic impact.

=== Departure from traditional utilities ===
An SEU departs from the traditional model of energy supply and expansion, as well as the traditional efficiency models for power plants and utilities. An SEU is focused on permanently lowering overall energy use and limiting supply to renewable energy sources. Rather than slowing the rate of energy market expansion or improving the efficiency of energy services, the SEU cuts energy requirements based on sustainability defined constraints; notably, the need to adhere to an annual 3.3 ton per capita emission budget for greenhouse gases released, expressed in a CO_{2} equivalent.

=== Community utility ===
An SEU functions as a 'community utility' directly accountable to the local community it serves as it seeks to deliver sustainable energy services. SEUs do not report to stockholders or utility regulators. SEUs can be organized by communities of almost any scale (towns, cities, or regions) seeking to gain independence and agency in their energy development pathway. As a community utility, the success of the SEU rests on the participation of local stakeholders, namely individuals, businesses, farms, localities, etc., and is directly answerable to these entities. The SEU itself remains independent.

== Sustainable Energy Bond (SEB) Program ==
=== Concept ===
The Sustainable Energy Bond (SEB) Program was pioneered by Dr. Byrne to build a clean energy infrastructure from guaranteed savings earned by participants. The SEU uses bonds at a scale which allows a city or a region to treat conserved and renewable energy as primary sources rather than the current situation in which fossil and nuclear energy sources dominate. Historically, tax-exempt bonds were used to underwrite investments in public goods and services and, for this reason, SEBs are seen as a critical tool for SEUs to serve their communities. An SEU can be given bond issuing capacity which allows it to sell tax-exempt bonds in order to treat sustainable energy as an infrastructure scale investment.

=== First implementation ===
In 2011, the Delaware SEU issued a statewide tax exempt bond for SEUs, the first of its kind in the U.S., acquiring $72.5 million for capital investments in sustainable energy measures. Targeting about 4% of Delaware's total state owned or managed building stock, the SEU bond issue included contractual guarantees of $148 million in savings which cut energy use in participating buildings by more than 25% for 20 years. The 2011 bond issue average payback period was almost 14 years and the longest maturity was 20 years, while average performance guarantees were greater than 20 years.

== Challenges ==
SEUs present a different paradigm in energy governance, and they can present unique challenges. One of the greatest challenges SEUs face is empowering communities to break away from the existing paradigm of top-down energy supply. Sometimes local initiatives have wide support at the outset, but as time passes, active participation is limited to a smaller core group. Adding to this situation is the problem of limited resources at the local level, making it challenging for the SEU movement to institutionalize and maintain momentum.

Another area of concern is solvency: financial sustainability of the initiative is vital to its long-term success, and the appropriation and allocation of funding can determine the longevity of the SEU itself. Depending on its organizational structure and funding source, the SEU can encounter problems when some of its dedicated funds are re-allocated to fill general obligation gaps in, for instance, the state budget. An example of a sustainable energy focused organization encountering such a difficulty is the New Jersey Clean Energy Program, a third-party demand-side management administrator operating in New Jersey. Sustaining a long-term program that seeks to implement transformative change further can encounter difficulties when operated in parallel with shorter-term projects. For example, shorter-term projects can capitalize on "low-hanging fruit" with quick returns, limiting funding allocation to multi-year projects. Support from local government and the possibility of collaborating with other available government programs can substantially increase success.

Practical operation of SEU models encountered some of these challenges. For instance, in 2016, after an investigation into one of the Delaware SEU projects, the Delaware State Auditor issued a report indicating several problems with the Delaware SEU 2011 bond program. A former Delaware State Senator published an opinion piece on Delaware Online in support of the State Auditor report. A presiding Senator, a member of the Delaware SEU's oversight board, disagreed with the findings of the Auditor, calling them "mystifying". Delaware SEU Executive Director defended the program by arguing that the State Auditor did not counsel with experts in the field of energy engineering and, as such, misrepresented the actual workings of the program. The Delaware Office of Management and Budget similarly questioned the validity of the Auditor's report. In 2018, the Delaware SEU was named Environmental Protection Agency (EPA) 2018 Energy STAR Partner of the Year and received the EPA Energy STAR Excellence Award. The Delaware SEU has Standards for Excellence accreditation by the Standards for Excellence Institute for its ethics, accountability, and transparency. Early evaluation of the 2011 bond program shows first-year savings exceeded the 25% savings guarantee by 3%. The Delaware SEU is registered as a non-profit, tax-exempt 501 (c)(3) entity. The Delaware SEU is operating and planning new rounds of the bond program.

== Diffusion of the Model ==
SEUs currently in practice in the U.S. are the Delaware SEU., the Washington D.C. SEU, the SCEF Program by the Sonoma County Water Agency (SCWA) in California, California's Sustainable Energy Bond Program by CSCDA and FREE and the Pennsylvania Sustainable Energy Finance program (PennSEF) by the Pennsylvania Treasury and FREE. International application of the SEU model is being investigated by the City of Seoul (South Korea) and the City of Thane (India).

Development of the Delaware SEU began in 2006. The Delaware General Assembly convened a bipartisan task force to research and recommend a course for sustainable energy in Delaware. The 2007 report published by the task force ("The Sustainable Energy Utility: a Delaware First") introduced the SEU as an approach that would move away from utility administered efficiency and renewables to an independent management system. Passage of the State Senate Bill 18 in 2007 created the Delaware SEU.

In 2007, the Center for Energy and Environmental Policy (University of Delaware) contributed to the design of the DC SEU by providing "technical support in analyzing options for effectively administering and implementing energy efficiency/conservation programs in the District of Columbia" and publishing a report detailing the findings.^{(see end of report for contract details)} The Clean and Affordable Energy Act of 2008 (D.C. Code §8-1773.01 et seq.) created the DC SEU as a private entity tasked to "administer sustainable energy programs in the District, including the development, coordination, and provision of programs for the purpose of promoting the sustainable use of energy in the District". The DC SEU management contract was awarded by the DC Council to Vermont Energy Investment Corporation (VEIC) in March 2011.

In 2012, the Sonoma County Water Agency launched the Sonoma County Efficiency Financing (SCEF) program following the SEU model. The SCEF program offered participating organizations a contractual dollar savings guarantee. The SCEF program intends to use tax-exempt bonds to finance the projects. In 2013, no-cost preliminary audits were conducted for nine organizations that expressed interest. To date, no efficiency retrofit project contracts have been executed under this program. Applied Solutions, a partner organization of the program, notes that this is due "to participants' hesitancy to move forward based on unfamiliarity with the program approach and competing funding mechanisms that offer grant (not just loan) funding such as Proposition 39 - the California Clean Energy Jobs Act."

In 2014, the California Statewide Communities Development Authority (CSCDA) and FREE partnered to provide public agencies throughout California with access to tax exempt financing for sustainable energy investments. The project was recommended to the members of the California League of Cities and the California State Association of Counties.

Created in 2014, the Pennsylvania Sustainable Energy Finance Program (PennSEF) is a partnership between the Pennsylvania Treasury Department and FREE with financial start-up support from the West Penn Power Sustainable Energy Fund. In 2017, PennSEF organized its first financing pool, called the Regional Streetlight Procurement Project (RSLPP) and brought to PennSEF by the Delaware Valley Regional Planning Commission (DVRPC). The pool brings together 35 municipalities around the city of Philadelphia in order to replace and retrofit 28,000 exterior lights, street lights, and traffic signals. The project guarantees gross energy savings of $30.6 million and, after deduction of all costs, deliver $15.6 million in net savings.

The mayor of Seoul, South Korea, Park Won-soon, launched a citizens’ campaign in April 2012 to reduce city's greenhouse emissions 25% by 2020 and 40% by 2030. The city has embarked on a One Less Nuclear Power Plant (OLNPP) strategy to realize these goals. The city cut its emissions by 11.9% in two years and was designated as the Global Earth Hour Capital 2015. The Seoul Metropolitan Government signed a memorandum of understanding with FREE on June 16, 2015, where both parties pledged to cooperate to design climate-sensitive, sustainable, and equitable energy policies for Seoul using the SEU model. Following the advice of a Seoul International Energy Advisory Committee (SIEAC), Seoul established a Seoul Energy Corporation in December 2016.
