= Southeastern University (disambiguation) =

Southeastern University is a university in Lakeland, Florida

Southeastern University may also refer to:

- Nova Southeastern University in Davie, Florida
- Southeastern Louisiana University in Hammond, Louisiana
- Southeastern Oklahoma State University in Durant, Oklahoma
- Southeastern University (Washington, D.C.)
- Nanjing University, formerly National Southeastern University, in Nanjing, Jiangsu, China
- University of Southeastern Philippines in Davao City

== See also ==
- Southeast University (disambiguation)
- Southeastern College (disambiguation)
