= Sant Feliu de Llobregat Cathedral =

Cathedral in Sant Feliu de Llobregat, Spain

Coordinates: 41°22′51″N 2°02′45″E

Sant Feliu de Llobregat Cathedral Catedral-Basílica del Santo Espíritu de Tarrasa
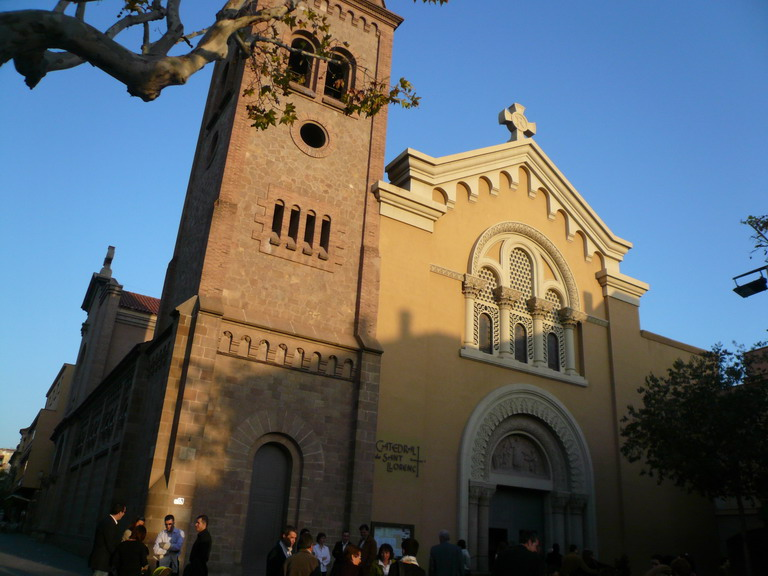
- Sant Feliu de Llobregat Cathedral

Religion
- Affiliation: Catholic Church

Location
- Location: Sant Feliu de Llobregat, Catalonia, Spain
- Interactive map of Sant Feliu de Llobregat Cathedral; Catedral-Basílica del Santo Espíritu de Tarrasa

Architecture
- Type: Church

Sant Feliu de Llobregat Cathedral or the Cathedral of Saint Lawrence (Catalan: Catedral de Sant Feliu de Llobregat, Catedral de Sant Llorenç, Spanish: Catedral de San Feliú de Llobregat, Catedral de San Lorenzo) is a Roman Catholic cathedral in Sant Feliu de Llobregat, Catalonia, Spain. It is the seat of the Diocese of Sant Feliu de Llobregat.

Originally a parish church, it was destroyed in the fighting of the Spanish Civil War in the 1930s, and only the bell tower remained. It was rebuilt according to the pseudo-medieval designs of architect Joan Ros. It was completed in 1955.

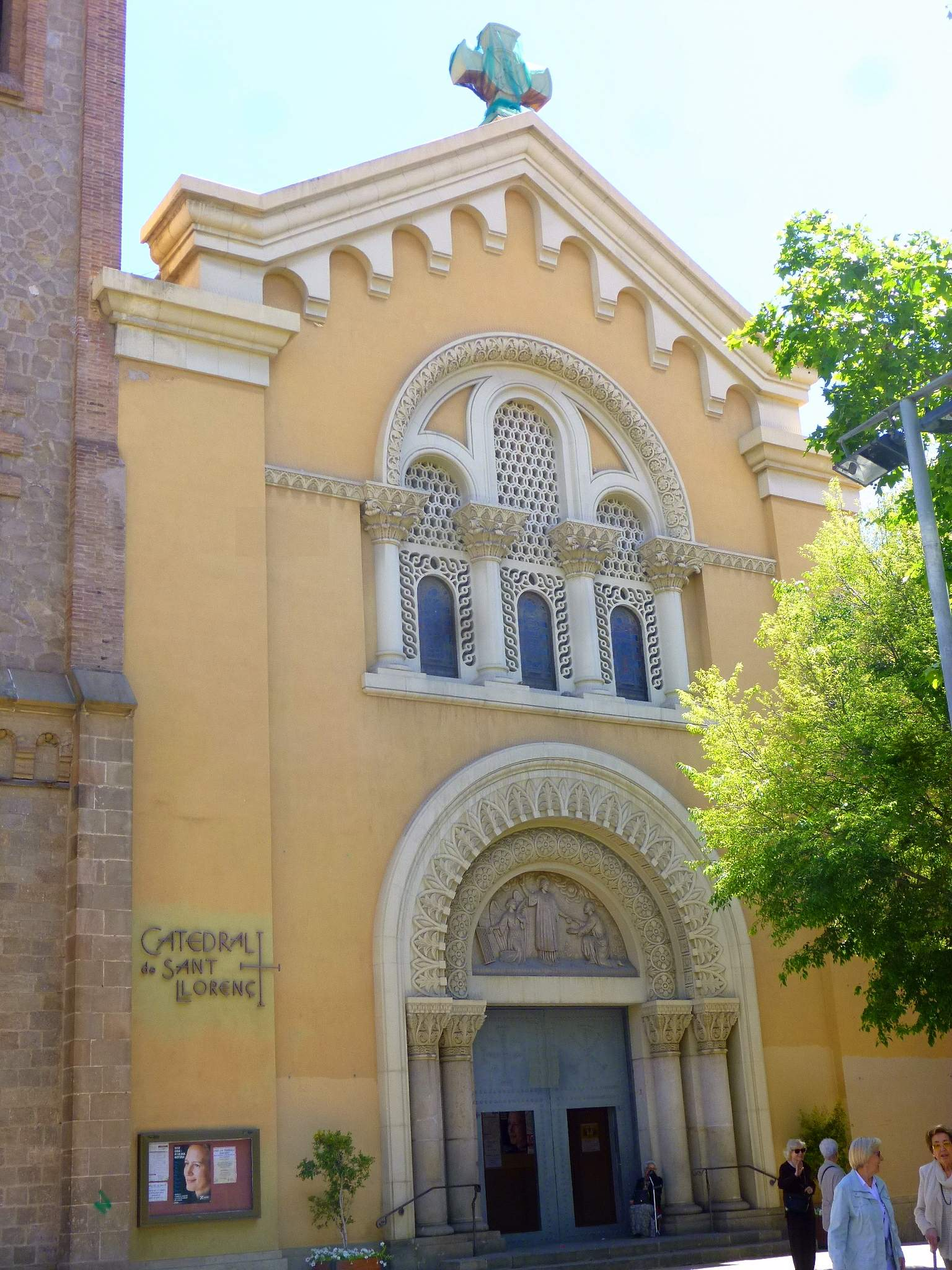
Close-up of the Cathedral façade

The Cathedral was the site of the ordination of the new Bishop in 2024, Xabier Gómez.

The plaza in front of the Cathedral is used for social and cultural events.

== See also ==
- Catholic Church in Spain
