= Southeast College =

- Type: Public post-secondary Regional College
- Established: 1975
- President: Vicky Roy
- Undergraduates: Available
- Location: Weyburn, SK S4H 0T1, Weyburn, Saskatchewan, Canada; 49.6709°N 103.8600°W
- Campus: Assiniboia, Estevan, Indian Head, Moosomin, Weyburn, Whitewood
- Website: http://www.southeastcollege.org

Southeast College (formerly Southeast Regional College) is a publicly funded regional college with six campuses in the southeast of the province of Saskatchewan, Canada. The college was created under the Regional Colleges Act of Saskatchewan. Its head office is located in Weyburn. The six campuses are located in Weyburn, Estevan, Moosomin, Assiniboia, Whitewood and Indian Head.

== See also ==
- Higher education in Saskatchewan
- List of colleges in Canada § Saskatchewan
