= List of OpenCL applications =

The following list contains a list of computer programs that are built to take advantage of the OpenCL or WebCL heterogeneous compute framework.

== Graphics ==
- ACDSee
- Adobe Photoshop
- Affinity Photo
- Capture One
- Blurate
- darktable
- FAST: imaging Medical
- GIMP, Experimental Playground must be enabled
- HALCON by MVTec
- Helicon Focus
- ImageMagick
- Musemage
- Pathfinder, GPU-based font rasterizer
- PhotoScan
- seedimg

== CAD and 3D modelling ==
- Autodesk Maya
- Houdini
- LuxRender
- Mandelbulber

== Audio, video, and multimedia ==
- AlchemistXF
- CUETools
- DaVinci Resolve by Blackmagic Design
- FFmpeg has a number of OpenCL filters
- gr-fosphor GNU Radio block for RTSA-like spectrum visualization
- HandBrake
- Final Cut Pro X
- KNLMeansCL: Denoise plugin for AviSynth
- Libav
- OpenCV
- RealFlow Hybrido2
- Sony Catalyst
- Vegas Pro by Magix Software GmbH
- vReveal by MotionDSP
- Total Media Theatre by ArcSoft
- x264
- x265
- h.265/HEVC possible

== Web (including WebCL) ==
- Google Chrome (experimental)
- Mozilla Firefox (experimental)

== Office ==
- Collabora Online
- LibreOffice Calc

== Games ==
- Military Operations, operational level real-time strategy game where the complete army is simulated in real-time using OpenCL
- Planet Explorers is using OpenCL to calculate the voxels.
- Leela Zero, open source replication of Alpha Go Zero using OpenCL for neural network computation.

== Scientific computing ==
- Advanced Simulation Library (ASL)
- AMD Compute Libraries
  - clBLAS, complete set of BLAS level 1, 2 & 3 routines
  - clSPARSE, routines for sparse matrices
  - clFFT, FFT routines
  - clRNG, random numbers generators MRG31k3p, MRG32k3a, LFSR113, and Philox-4×32-10
- ArrayFire: parallel computing with an easy-to-use API with JIT compiler (open source),
- BEAGLE, Bayesian and Maximum Likelihood phylogenetics library
- BigDFT
- BOINC
- Bolt, STL-compatible library for creating accelerated data parallel applications
- Bullet
- CLBlast: tuned clBlas
- clMAGMA, OpenCL port of the MAGMA project, a linear algebra library similar to LAPACK
- CP2K: molecular simulations
- Geostack, a high-performance geospatial processing, modelling, and analysis library and Web API, with C++ and Python bindings.
- GROMACS: chemical simulations, deprecated OpenCL with Version 2021 with change to SYCL
- HiFlow3: Open source finite elements CFD
- HIP, CUDA-to-portable C++ compiler
- LAMMPS
- MDT (Microstructure Diffusion Toolbox): MRI analysis in Python and OpenCL
- MOT (Multi-threaded Optimization Toolbox): OpenCL accelerated non-linear optimization and MCMC sampling
- OCCA
- Octopus
- OpenMM: Part of Omnia Suite, biomolecular simulations
- PARALUTION
- pyFAI, Fast Azimuthal Integration in Python
- Random123, library of counter-based random number generators
- SecondSpace, simulation software for waves in 2D space
- StarPU, task programming library
- Theano: Python array library
- UFO, data processing framework
- VexCL, vector expression template library
- ViennaCL and PyViennaCL, linear algebra library developed at TU Wien

== Cryptography ==
- BFGMiner,
- Hashcat, password recovery tool
- John the Ripper,
- Scallion, GPU-based Onion hash generator
- Pyrit, WPA key recovery software

== Language bindings ==
- ClojureCL: parallel OpenCL 2.0 with Clojure
- dcompute: native Execution of D
- Erlang OpenCL binding
- OpenCLAda: Binding Ada to OpenCL
- OpenCL.jl: Julia bindings
- PyOpenCL, Python interface to OpenCL API
- Project Coriander: Conversion CUDA to OpenCL 1.2 with CUDA-on-CL
- Lightweight Java Game Library (LWJGL) contains low-lag Java bindings for OpenCL

== Miscellaneous ==
- clinfo
- clpeak, peak device capability profiler
- OCLToys, collection of OpenCL examples
- opencl-stream, OpenCL implementation of the STREAM benchmark
- SNU NPB, benchmark
- mixbench, benchmark tool for evaluating GPUs on mixed operational intensity kernels

== See also ==
- List of OpenGL programs
