= OpenKODE =

Application programming interface

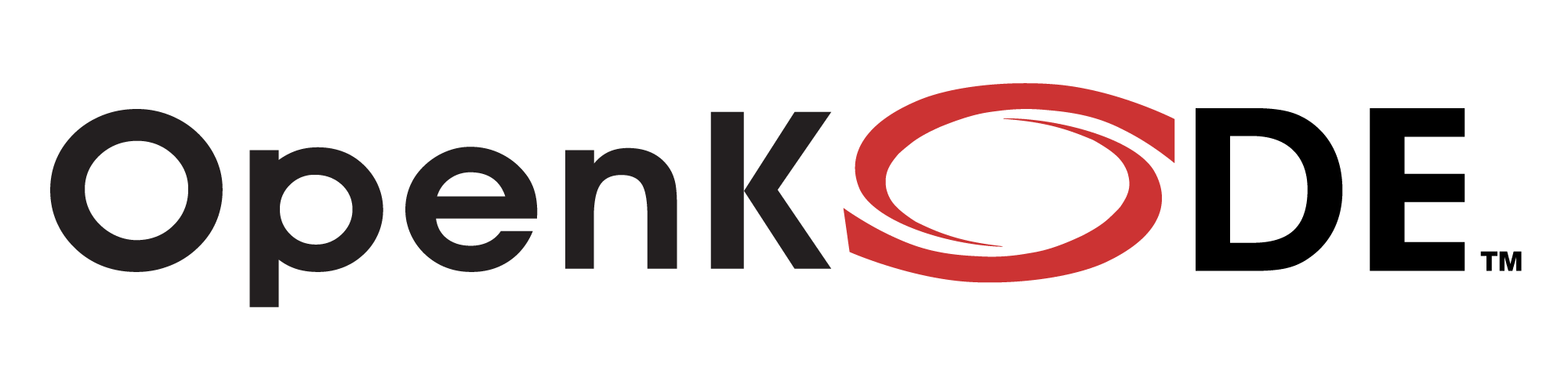
- Developer: Khronos Group, Inc.
- Stable release: 1.0.3 / May 20, 2009; 17 years ago
- Operating system: Cross-platform
- Type: API
- License: Various
- Website: www.khronos.org/openkode/

OpenKODE is a set of native APIs for handheld games and media applications providing a cross-platform abstraction layer for other media technologies such as OpenGL ES, OpenVG, OpenMAX AL and OpenSL ES. Besides of being an umbrella specification of the other APIs, OpenKODE also contains an API of its own, OpenKODE Core. OpenKODE Core defines POSIX-like functions to access operating system resources such as file access.

OpenKODE is managed by the non-profit technology consortium Khronos Group.

== See also ==
- DirectX
