= SLES =

SLES may refer to:

- Sodium lauryl ether sulfate, a surfactant found in many personal care products
- SUSE Linux Enterprise Server, a server-oriented Linux distribution

== See also ==
- OpenSL ES, Open Sound Library for Embedded Systems
