= OpenML =

OpenML may refer to:

- OpenML (Open Machine Learning), an open science online platform for machine learning, which holds open data, open algorithms and tasks
- OpenML (Open Media Library), a free, cross-platform programming environment designed by the Khronos Group for capturing, transporting, processing, displaying, and synchronizing digital media (2D and 3D graphics, audio and video processing, I/O, and networking)
