= IWOCL =

Technology conference

- Status: Active/Ongoing
- Genre: OpenCL Heterogeneous computing
- Inaugurated: 2013
- Most recent: April 2025, Heidelberg, Germany
- Next event: 2026
- Organizer: IWOCL
- Website: www.iwocl.org

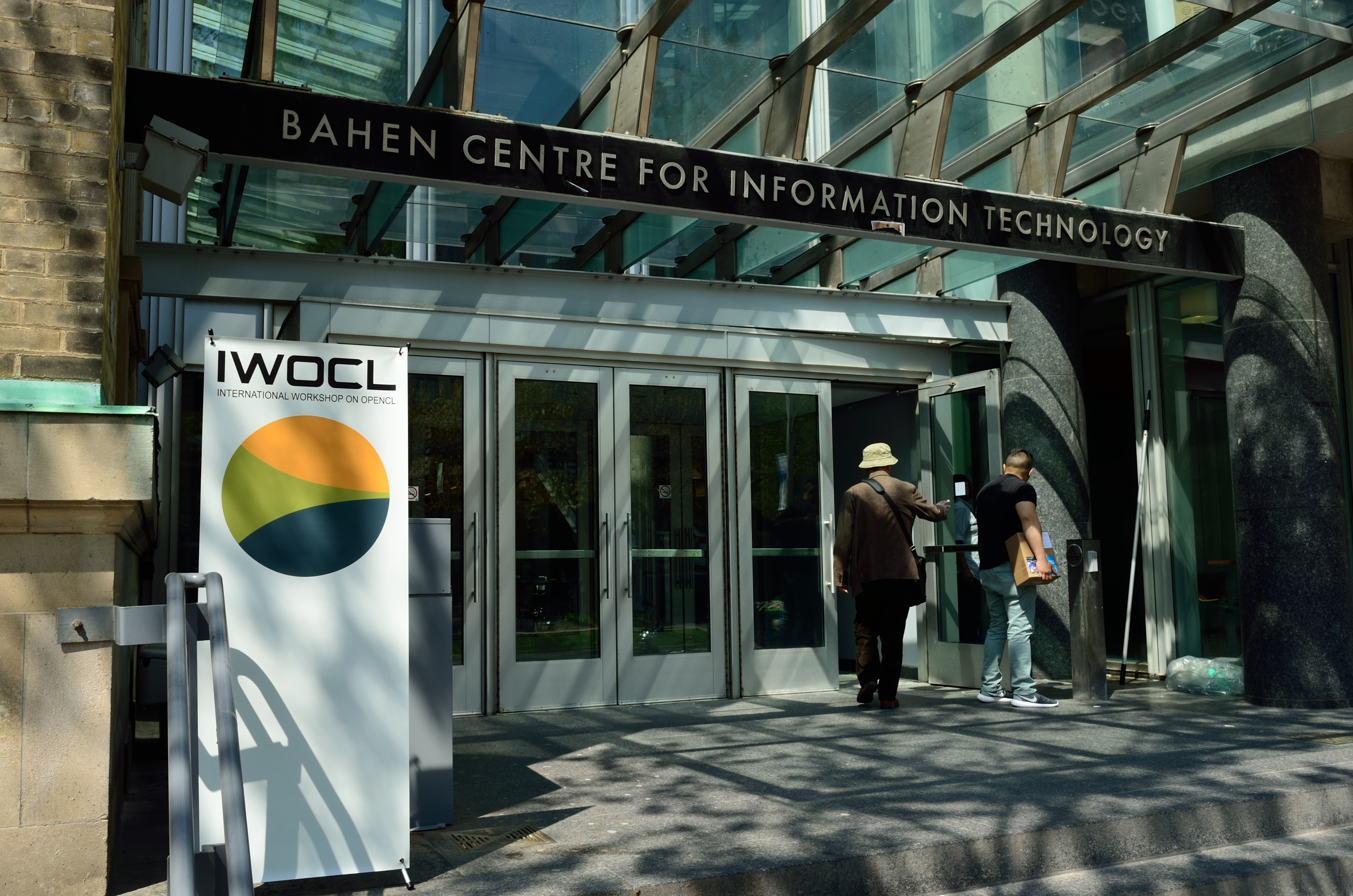
IWOCL 2017 in Toronto

The International Workshop on OpenCL (IWOCL, pronounced "eye-wok-ul") is an annual conference focused on the Khronos Group OpenCL standard. It brings together users, researchers, developers, implementers, and vendors to discuss research, applications, tools, and developments related to parallel programming on heterogeneous computing systems.

Participation at IWOCL is open to anyone who is interested in contributing to, and participating in the OpenCL community. This includes developers working with the many APIs, tools and libraries built on OpenCL, such as the Khronos Standard Portable Intermediate Representation (SPIR) and the SYCL C++ abstraction layer.

== Technical program and submissions ==
A Call for Sessions usually goes out in the Autumn before the event the following May.

The technical program comprises research papers (published in the ACM Conference Series), technical presentations and posters, preceded by a day of workshops. All submissions are reviewed by a Technical Committee comprising world-leaders in the field of OpenCL and Heterogeneous computing.

== Event History and Dates ==
Conference	Location	Dates	Link / Archive
IWOCL 2025	Heidelberg, Germany	Apr 7–11	Website
IWOCL 2024	Chicago, United States	Apr 8–11	Program Archive
IWOCL 2023	Cambridge, UK	Apr 18–22	Program Archive
IWOCL 2022	Virtual	May 10–12	Program Archive
IWOCL 2021	Virtual	Apr 27–29	Program Archive
IWOCL 2020	Virtual	Apr 27–29	Program Archive
IWOCL 2019	Boston, USA	May 13–15	Program Archive
IWOCL 2018	Oxford, UK	May 14–16	Program Archive
IWOCL 2017	Toronto, Canada	May 16–18	Program Archive
IWOCL 2016	Vienna, Austria	April 19–21	Program Archive
IWOCL 2015	Stanford, USA	May 12–13	Program Archive
IWOCL 2014	Bristol, England	May 12–13	Program Archive
IWOCL 2013	Georgia Tech, USA	May 13–14	Program Archive

== Event organization ==
IWOCL is a community led, not-for profit event chaired by Simon McIntosh-Smith, Professor in High Performance Computing and Head of the Microelectronics Group at the University of Bristol.
