= Trevett =

Trevett is both a given name and a surname. Notable people with the name include:

- Trevett Read (1893–1976), British footballer
- John Trevett (1942–2019), British cricketer
- Nathan Trevett (born 1985), British rugby union player
- Neil Trevett, British electrical engineer and executive
