= OpenGL SC =

- Developer(s): Khronos Group
- Stable release: 2.0.1 / July 24, 2019; 5 years ago
- Written in: C
- Operating system: Cross-platform
- Platform: Cross-platform
- Type: API
- License: Various
- Website: www.khronos.org/openglsc/

OpenGL for Safety Critical applications (OpenGL SC) is a subset of the OpenGL 3D graphics application programming interface (API) designed to meet the needs of the Safety Critical market for avionics, industrial, military, medical and automotive applications including FAA DO-178C/ED-12C Level A certification. OpenGL SC is managed by the not-for-profit technology consortium, the Khronos Group, Inc.

OpenGL SC 2.0 is based on OpenGL ES 2.0, adding GLSL shader programmability to OpenGL SC 1.0.

OpenGL SC 1.0 is based on, and roughly equivalent to, OpenGL 1.3. Equivalence is not strictly maintained, and features not in the original API specification were added, such as display lists.
