= Neil Trevett =

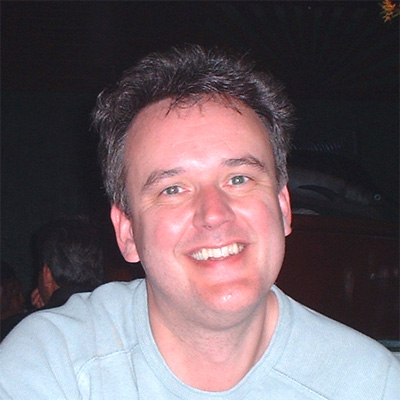
- In September 2008
- Born: Bridport, United Kingdom
- Occupation(s): Vice president of Mobile Ecosystem, NVIDIA Corporation

Neil Trevett is an electrical engineer and executive involved in 3D computer graphics technology.

== Biography ==
Trevett holds a first-class with honors joint B.Sc. electronic engineering and computer science degree from the University of Birmingham, England.

In 1985, Trevett joined benchMark Technologies as head of graphics systems. (benchMark became DuPont Pixel Systems, evolved into the independently owned 3Dlabs, Inc., and was acquired by Creative Labs). Trevett held the position of senior vice president of 3Dlabs from 1994 to 2005. He holds several patents in graphics technology.

From 1997–2005, Trevett served as president of the Web3D Consortium. Trevett was elected president of the Khronos Group in 2001, where he created and chaired the OpenGL ES working group, which has defined a standard for 3D graphics on embedded devices. Trevett also chairs the OpenCL working group at Khronos defining an open standard for heterogeneous computing.

In July 2005 he became vice president of mobile ecosystem at Nvidia where he is responsible for enabling and encouraging visual computing applications on non-PC platforms, including mobile phones.
