= OpenWF =

- Developer: Khronos Group, Inc.
- Stable release: 1.0 / November 9, 2009; 16 years ago
- Operating system: Cross-platform
- Type: API
- License: Various
- Website: www.khronos.org/openwf/

OpenWF (Open Windowing Foundation) is a royalty-free, cross-platform API that provides a low-level hardware abstraction interface for composited windowing systems to make use of composition and display hardware. OpenWF is targeted primarily at handheld devices that require portable acceleration of composition whilst minimizing memory bandwidth usage and power levels. OpenWF is managed by the non-profit technology consortium Khronos Group.

The OpenWF consists of two specifications.

- OpenWF Composition for accelerating composition of multimedia and graphics content. OpenWF Composition includes the ability to autonomously composite streams of pixel data to on-screen and off-screen destinations.
- OpenWF Display for managing display control hardware. OpenWF Display includes the ability to perform mode-setting on internal and external displays as well as discovery and querying of newly connected displays. Direct pipeline control allows composition of images and streams.

== Implementations ==
Wayland had support for an OpenWF backend but this was later removed due to lack of maintenance.

DirectFB have plans to add support for OpenWF.

QNX Neutrino, widely deployed, such as in infotainment panels of Volkswagen vehicles, uses OpenWF.

== See also ==
- The OpenWF API registry for header files and sample implementations for the core Composition and Display APIs.
