= Planet Explorers =

2016 video game

- Developer: Pathea Games
- Publisher: Pathea Games
- Engine: Unity
- Platforms: Microsoft Windows, OS X, Linux
- Release: WW: November 8, 2016
- Genres: Adventure, sandbox, role-playing
- Modes: Single-player, multiplayer

Planet Explorers is an adventure role-playing video game developed and published by Pathea Games. Development began in January 2014, existing as an early access game. The game was released on 8 November 2016 for Microsoft Windows, OS X and Linux on the Steam digital distribution platform.

The gameplay of Planet Explorers allows players to change the terrain, to build walls, bridges and ramps, up to complex structures and buildings with a lot of customization, to save and copy them. Players can create an unlimited number of objects, including weapons, armor and different vehicles in any form with stats depending on their ingredients/materials, and to do this anywhere. Other activities in the game include exploration, resource gathering and combat. As of June 2019, multiplayer is no longer available due to code being deleted from their servers. The game is now free to play on Steam. The source code to the game will be released in the near future.

== Gameplay ==
Planet Explorers is a third- or first-person (F5-key toggles the view), sandbox adventure game. Players can build custom vehicles, weapons, VTOL and pretty much anything else and use it in game. There are two major gameplay areas in Planet Explorers, one being the Story mode, the other being Adventure mode. Story mode features a set map and multiple quests that progress throughout the game. Adventure mode is a random procedural map that contains random quests and events, which lets players select the type of planet and climate they want to visit, so that they can quickly buy goods in such established colony. Further, the game play is a mixture of 3rd person action and adventure, with the player able to use multiple weapons and objects. There are around 70 kinds of creatures and more than 15 kinds of minerals that can be utilized by humans on planet Maria. Although some creatures are as tall as buildings and are fierce enough to kill humans, herbivores tend to be docile.

This sandbox game makes use of a new OpenCL system on the Unity engine, which enables players to alter the terrain and create objects.

=== Story mode ===
This game mode involves following the main story quest arc, in addition to numerous side quests, to progress through the game. It features a 17x8 km world map with many unique characters, landscapes, locations and over 100 types of potential enemies. Players are free to choose how to play the story, they can fight or be peaceful, build a farm, make food, keep the colonists alive, negotiate with the sentient aliens or defend the perimeter from the local life forms. Story mode also features co-op with other players.

=== Adventure mode ===
Adventure mode was added to Planet Explorers in Alpha version 0.61. In this mode, the game creates a random procedural map that contains random quests and events. However, the players can select the type of planet and climate. It allows the players to wander freely in an open world, buy templates, resources and equipment.

=== Builder mode ===
In builder mode, players have access to infinite resources, items and equipment in the game through the inventory menu, and can place or remove them instantly. This mode has no enemies and helps the players focus on building and creating large projects.

== Plot ==
Planet Explorers takes place in the year 2287. One of the first colony ships sent out by Earth arrives at the planet Maria, an unknown planet in the Epsilon Indi Star System. During its landing sequence, as something goes wrong, the massive ship loses control and crashes into the planet. What originally was a first colony mission has now turned into a mission for mere survival on an unforgiving planet filled with creatures ready to outlast the visitors from Earth. In order to survive in this new world the survivors will have to explore, gather, build, create, fight or befriend the planet inhabitants, and ultimately, establish a lasting new home.

== Development ==
=== Voice cast ===
The primary quest giver, Ataro Baatar is voiced by actor Vincent van Ommen. Other voice talents include Ben Britton, Katabelle, Anthony Sardinha, and Omri Rose.

== Soundtrack ==
The Planet Explorers - Official Soundtrack is composed by Aakaash Rao and features woodwind players Sandro Friedrich and Lucian Nagy, cellist Deryn Cullen, and singers Zefora Alderman and Graham Foote. The soundtrack contains 14 tracks and has been be made available on Valve's digital distribution platform, Steam, as downloadable content for the main game.

== Reception ==
Planet Explorers

Review scores
Publication	Score
GamesFinder	9.0/10
SirusGaming	7.0/10
GameInformer	5/5

The public alpha release was generally well received. Many publications and individual people have referred fondly to Planet Explorers and praised the game's creative aspects and unlimited options of customization, including PC Gamer, Rock, Paper, Shotgun and RatSplatGaming. However, most reviewers refrained from giving an actual score based on the game's early access status.

PC Gamer's Emanuel Maiberg described an early iteration of the in-development game as "There are hundreds of hours of entertainment to be had with Planet Explorers if you want put in the time to extract them but it's too unattractive to bear for that long." and criticized user-interface elements and the technical issues with the game, though mentioning that Pathea Games updates the game regularly.

Planet Minecraft praised the unlimited possibilities the game has to offer, ultimately saying "Is it worth the money? I really believe it is. The vision of where the game will go in the future is really exciting."
