= MotionDSP =

MotionDSP was a Burlingame, California-based company making real-time, GPU-accelerated image processing software for Full Motion Video (FMV) and Wide Area Motion Imagery (WAMI). The company was founded in 2005 with technology from the University of California, Santa Cruz. The name is now used for a product line of Cubic Digital Intelligence.

MotionDSP's “Ikena” family of Windows-based products improved the quality of video from security/surveillance video platforms, as well as a variety of video formats such as mobile phones and security cameras (CCTV), as well as to provide redaction capabilities. "Ikena ISR" was designed for real-time FMV applications (military and homeland security markets), and "Ikena" was designed for forensic video enhancement applications (law enforcement and commercial security markets). MotionDSP's solutions supported operational deployments within the US Department of Defense and National Intelligence agencies, and its customers also include the US Air Force, Navy, and some of the world's leading video forensic labs such as the US Secret Service, NCIS, and the London Metropolitan Police (Scotland Yard).

On February 22, 2018, Cubic Corporation announced its acquisition of MotionDSP.
