= OpenSL ES =

- Developer: Khronos Group, Inc.
- Stable release: 1.1 / January 18, 2011; 15 years ago
- Operating system: Cross-platform
- Type: API
- License: Royalty free
- Website: www.khronos.org/opensles/

OpenSL ES (Open Sound Library for Embedded Systems) is a royalty-free, cross-platform, hardware-accelerated, C-language audio API for 2D and 3D audio. It provides access to features such as 3D positional audio and MIDI playback. It is made for developers in the mobile and gaming industry and is working toward allowing for easy porting of applications across multiple platforms.

== Overview ==
The OpenSL ES API has five major features:

- Basic audio playback and recording
- 3D audio effects including 3D positional audio
- Music experience enhancing effects including bass boost and environmental reverb
- Interactive music and ringtones using SP-MIDI, Mobile DLS, Mobile XMF
- Buffer Queues

The features of Audio Playback and Recording and Basic MIDI are common with OpenMAX AL.

== Design ==
OpenSL ES utilizes an object oriented design to give application developers access to the audio functionality. The object model is shared with OpenMAX AL, and a device manufacturer can choose to implement one or both of the APIs. Together the two APIs give access to a wide range of functionality of the device's multimedia engine.

The design goal of OpenSL ES is to give application developers access to advanced audio features such as 3D positional audio and MIDI playback while striving for easy application porting between manufacturers and platforms. It is developed primarily for application developers in the mobile and gaming industry.

== Profiles ==
To avoid fragmentation, OpenSL ES is divided up into three profiles:

- Phone
- Music
- Game

Each profile is designed for the respective device needs with a specific set of audio functionalities. A vendor can choose to be conformant with only one or with any combination of profiles.

An application can query the OpenSL ES implementation to find out which profiles are supported. The application developer can then design their application to either work with only the common parts of the profiles, or adapt to the available functionality as given by the profiles in the device it is running on. An application developer can also specify both the minimum and the optimal profile requirements.

== Development ==
OpenSL ES is managed by the non-profit technology consortium Khronos Group. The current chair of the OpenSL ES working group is Erik Noreke.

== Specification versions ==
- OpenSL ES 1.0 Specification was released 24 March 2009.
- Minor release 1.0.1 followed 24 September 2009.
- OpenSL ES 1.1 Specification was released 18 January 2011.

== Implementations ==
- Android 2.3 exposes OpenSL ES 1.0 as part of their Android NDK. The latency of the implementation has improved in later releases.
- A full implementation of OpenSL ES 1.1 is available from SRS Labs.

== See also ==
- OpenMAX AL - Application level multimedia API
- OpenAL - advanced audio API for desktop and mobile
- Advanced Multimedia Supplements (JSR 234) - Java API for mobile devices
