= Khronos Group =

Not-for-profit member-funded industry consortium

The Khronos Group, Inc.
- Type: Consortium
- Industry: Open standards
- Founded: 2000; 26 years ago
- Founder: ATI Technologies; Discreet; Evans & Sutherland; Intel Corporation; SGI; Sun Microsystems
- Headquarters: Beaverton, Oregon, US
- Key people: Neil Trevett (President)
- Services: Open standards for 3D graphics, extended reality, parallel computing, machine learning, and computer vision
- Website: www.khronos.org

The Khronos Group, Inc. is an open standards organization that is driven by over 180 member companies developing, publishing and maintaining royalty-free interoperability standards for 3D graphics, virtual reality, augmented reality, parallel computation, vision acceleration and machine learning. The open standards and associated conformance tests enable software applications and middleware to effectively harness authoring and accelerated playback of dynamic media across a wide variety of platforms and devices. The group is based in Beaverton, Oregon.

== History ==
The Khronos Group was founded in 2000 by companies including 3Dlabs, ATI, Discreet, Evans & Sutherland, Intel, SGI, and Sun Microsystems. Promoter members include AMD, Apple, Arm, Epic Games, Google, Huawei, Nokia, Imagination, Intel, Nvidia, Qualcomm, Samsung, Sony, Valve and Verisilicon. Its president is Neil Trevett.

== Specifications and working groups ==
Each specification / standard is managed by a working group which is established to define the requirements, solicit input, discuss, and create a specification. There are currently 16 working groups.

== Active standards ==
- 3D Commerce, universal guidelines, standards and certifications for 3D content creation and distribution in e-commerce
- ANARI, Analytic Rendering Interface for Data Visualization
- COLLADA, a file-format intended to facilitate interchange of 3D assets
- EGL, an interface between rendering APIs (such as OpenGL ES) and the native window system
- glTF, a file format specification for 3D scenes and models
- Kamaros, a cross-platform API for programming camera and sensor hardware, and ISP processing
- KTX, a container file format for storing GPU-ready texture data
- NNEF reduces machine learning deployment fragmentation by enabling a rich mix of neural network training tools and inference engines to be used by applications across a diverse range of devices and platforms
- OpenCL, a cross-platform computation API
- OpenGL, a cross-platform computer graphics API
- OpenGL ES, a derivative of OpenGL for use on mobile and embedded systems, such as cell phones, portable gaming devices, and more
- OpenGL SC, a safety critical profile of OpenGL ES designed to meet the needs of the safety-critical market
- OpenVG, an API for accelerating processing of 2D vector graphics
- OpenVX, Hardware acceleration API for computer vision applications and libraries
- OpenXR, an open and royalty-free standard for virtual reality and augmented reality applications and devices
- Slang, open-source shading language and compiler/transpiler that targets existing shading languages (GLSL, MSL, CUDA, WGSL), bytecodes (D3D11, D3D12, Vulkan SPIR-V) as well as the CPU. Mostly source code compatible with HLSL and GLSL.
- SPIR-V, an intermediate compiler target for OpenCL and Vulkan
- SYCL, a single-source C++ DSEL for heterogeneous computing
- Vulkan, a low-overhead computer graphics API
- Vulkan SC, based on the existing Vulkan API specification to enable safety critical industries
- WebGL, a JavaScript binding to OpenGL ES within a browser on any platform supporting the OpenGL or OpenGL ES graphics standards

A timeline of API Specification ratification and releases can be found on the Khronos Group website.

== Exploratory groups and councils ==
Typically, Khronos first creates an exploratory group to gauge industry interest before creating a working group, which companies can join as members to assist in the development of the standard.

- Machine Learning Council, a collaborative forum composed of Khronos member companies working to ensure that Khronos AI and ML related standards evolve in line with industry needs.

=== Other activities ===
- Member of the Metaverse Standards Forum, working on development of interoperability standards for an inclusive and open metaverse, in conjunction with other international standards organizations

=== Inactive standards and exploratory groups ===
- OpenML, an API for capturing, transporting, processing, displaying, and synchronizing digital media
- OpenKODE, an API for providing abstracted, portable access to operating system resources such as file systems, networks and math libraries
- OpenKCam, Advanced Camera Control API
- OpenMAX, a layered set of three programming interfaces of various abstraction levels, providing access to multimedia functionality
- OpenSL ES, an audio API tuned for embedded systems, standardizing access to features such as 3D positional audio and MIDI playback
- OpenWF, APIs for 2D graphics composition and display control
- StreamInput, an API for consistently handling input devices
- WebCL, a JavaScript binding to OpenCL within a browser
- HetComm Exploratory Group worked on a low level API to facilitate communication between hardware components in heterogenous systems

== Members ==
=== Membership and contributions ===
Khronos members may contribute to the development of Khronos API specifications, vote at various stages before public deployment, and accelerate delivery of their platforms and applications through early access to specification drafts and conformance tests. To ensure that the standards are consistently implemented and to create a reliable platform for developers, any product that implements a Khronos API standard must pass conformance tests. An API Adopter Program enables companies to test their products for conformance. Membership in Khronos Group provides access to an IP framework designed to protect participant IP. Khronos members agree not to assert IP rights against adopters implementing Khronos specifications. The IP framework protects Khronos members from exposure to patent lawsuits and reduces the amount of IP that needs to be licensed from other group members.

=== Membership levels ===
- Promoter: Full working group participation with voting rights, plus the right to designate a Director to the Khronos Board.
- Contributor: Full working group participation with voting rights.
- Non-Profit: Full working group participation. Available to registered non-profit organizations.
- Academic: Full working group participation. Available to accredited academic institutions.
- Associate: Full working group participation. Available to companies with up to 100 employees.

== See also ==
- List of free and open-source software organizations
- List of technical standard organizations
