= Informatics General =

Informatics General Corporation
- Type: Public
- Traded as: NYSE: IG
- Industry: Software products; Software contracting; Service bureaus
- Founded: Woodland Hills, Los Angeles, California (March 19, 1962)
- Founders: Walter Bauer; Werner Frank; Richard Hill
- Defunct: August 13, 1985
- Fate: Acquired
- Headquarters: Woodland Hills, Los Angeles, California, United States
- Number of locations: 30 in North America; 9 overseas
- Key people: Frank Wagner; John Postley; Bill Plumb; Warner Blow; Mike Parrella; Geno Tolari
- Products: File management and report generation; many others
- Brands: "Fulfilling the computer's promise"
- Revenue: $191 million (1984, equivalent to $592 million today)
- Net income: $5 million (1984)
- Number of employees: 2,600 (1985)
- Divisions: Software Products Group; Data Services; Answer; Management Services; TAPS; Life Insurance Systems; Legal Information Services; Professional Software Systems; others

Informatics General Corporation, earlier known as Informatics, Inc., was an American computer software company in existence from 1962 through 1985 and based in Los Angeles, California. It made a variety of software products, and was especially known for its Mark IV file management and report generation product for IBM mainframes, which became the best-selling corporate packaged software product of its time. It also contracted with government entities such as the NASA Ames Research Center for long-running professional services engagements; ran computer service bureaus; and sold turnkey systems to specific industries. By the mid-1980s Informatics had revenues of near $200 million and over 2,500 employees.

Computer historian Martin Campbell-Kelly, in his 2003 volume From Airline Reservations to Sonic the Hedgehog: A History of the Software Industry, considers Informatics to be an exemplar of the independent, middle-sized software development firms of its era, and the Computer History Museum as well as the Charles Babbage Institute at the University of Minnesota have conducted a number of oral histories of the company's key figures. Historian Jeff Yost identifies Informatics as a pioneering "system integration" company, similar to System Development Corporation. The Chicago Tribune wrote that Informatics was "long a legend in software circles".

Informatics General was acquired by Sterling Software in 1985 in what was the first hostile takeover in the software industry. Immediately, Sterling Software became a member of the largest corporations within the software industry, with $200 million in revenue.

== Background and founding ==
Walter F. Bauer (1924–2015), the main founder of Informatics, was from Michigan and earned a Ph.D. in mathematics from the University of Michigan in 1951. His early work was at the Michigan Aeronautical Research Center; the National Bureau of Standards, where he programmed the early digital SEAC computer; and for Boeing's BOMARC interceptor missile. He became a manager at the Ramo-Wooldridge Corporation in charge of a unit with 400 employees and two computers, an IBM 704 and a UNIVAC 1103A, and in 1958 joined the merged Thompson Ramo Wooldridge company. Bauer later said that he "was never a green eyeshade programmer" nor a "strong technologist", but being a systems person and a manager gave him a good grasp of computer systems and their capabilities.

Another key founder was Werner L. Frank (1929–), who during 1954–55 had done programming work on the ILLIAC I at the University of Illinois at Urbana–Champaign. He was then recruited by Bauer and joined Ramo-Wooldridge in 1955, where he did numerical analysis and programming in assembly language and FORTRAN. Working with pioneers of scientific computing such as David M. Young, Jr. and George Forsythe, Frank published several important articles on numerical analysis in Journal of the ACM and other publications. By 1958, Ramo-Wooldridge had been acquired by Thompson Products, Inc. and come to be known as TRW Inc.; Frank then did early programming on several defense industry computers, including the AN/UYK-1, and spent long stretches of time in Washington, D.C.

The third founder was another TRW colleague, Richard H. Hill, who had been a professor at UCLA and an assistant director of a joint data center between that university and IBM.

In January 1962, Bauer approached Frank and Hill to start a new independent company that would provide software services. At the time, it was an unusual move since few people saw software as a viable business. "Primarily, we were going to develop systems for large-scale computer systems, probably of a military nature. That was our first objective," stated Bauer in a later interview. Despite a lack of any kind of business school training, Bauer put together a business plan for the new company. Indeed, throughout his time with the company, Bauer embodied the personality characteristics of entrepreneurship.

Venture capital was hard to locate for such start-ups in that era and Bauer met with several rejections. He and the others then decided to join forces with Data Products Corporation, a newly formed manufacturer of computer peripheral equipment. The co-founder of Data Products, Erwin Tomash (1921–2012), was from Minnesota and had earlier worked at Engineering Research Associates, a pioneering computer firm from the 1950s. He had known Bauer and thought that the two new efforts being formed together would provide a hedge against either one of them encountering start-up difficulties. Informatics was thus created as a wholly owned subsidiary of Data Products. The new software firm was capitalized at all of $40,000, of which Data Products contributed $20,000, Bauer $10,000, and Frank and Hill $5,000 each.

== The name ==
The earlier company logo, used from the 1960s to 1982

The company's name came from the founders' desire to base it on "-atics", a Greek suffix meaning "the science of". Their first thought was "Datamatics", but a form of that was already taken by an early computer from Honeywell/Raytheon; Bauer and the others settled on "Informatics", meaning "the science of information handling".

At the very same time, March 1962, French computer pioneer Philippe Dreyfus came up with the name "Société pour l'informatique appliquée" for a new firm of which he was co-founder, thus creating a French version of the same name. However, in France, the term "informatique" soon became a generic name, meaning the modern science of information handling, and would become accepted by the Académie française as an official French word. The term then came into common use in a number of other European countries, adapted slightly for each language.

In the United States, however, Informatics fought any such use as an infringement upon their legal rights to the name; this was partly in fear of the term becoming a brandnomer. Bauer later recalled that at one point the Association for Computing Machinery, the leading academic organization in computer software, wanted to change its name to the Society for Informatics, but the company refused to allow that use. Eventually the generic usage of the term around the world caused the company to reconsider and, according to Frank, was the reason for the 1982 name change to Informatics General.

== Early history ==
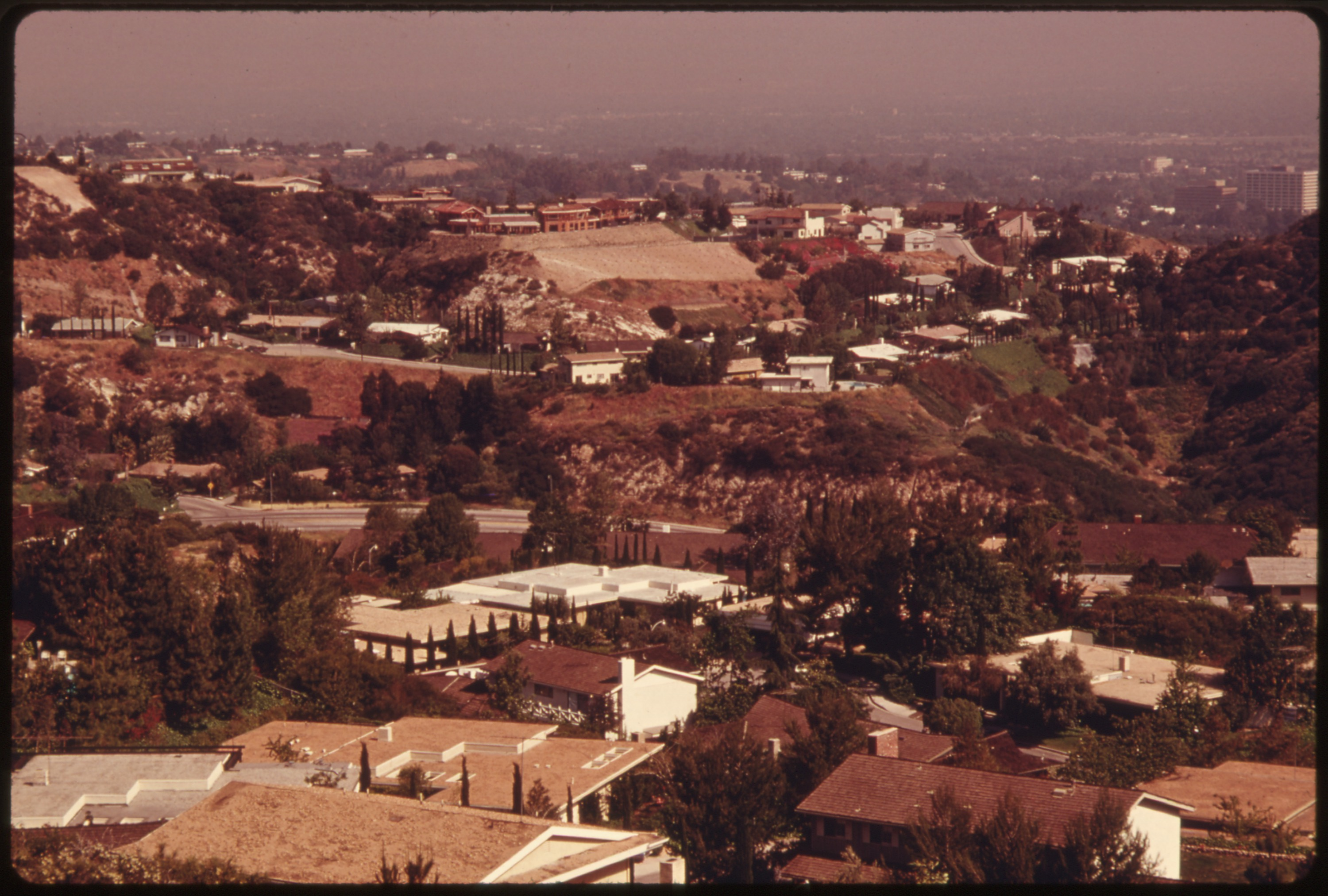
Informatics began in the Woodland Hills area of Los Angeles, California.

Informatics, Inc. began operations on March 19, 1962, in Frank's empty house in Woodland Hills in the San Fernando Valley area of Los Angeles. In addition to the three founders, the fourth initial employee was a secretary, Marie Kirchner. An important early hire was Frank Wagner, a North American Aviation executive who was past president of the IBM user group SHARE and had many contacts among that community. Data Products, which served as the Informatics back office, was located in nearby Culver City at that time.

The company struggled at first, winning only a few small contracts, until it improved its presence in government circles and finally, in early 1963, won a $150,000 contract with the Rome Air Defense Center. This was a forerunner of several large contracts it would have with that U.S. Air Force facility in years to come, and several other defense sector contracts soon followed. By its second year, Informatics was profitable and had 37 employees; by the third year it was growing well. Informatics was one of the major companies of the time involved in the software contracting business. An early description of the company used in press releases was "Informatics provides analysis, design and consulting services for users of digital processing equipment."

At the time Informatics did little marketing, mostly relying upon its network of personal contacts. The firm was one of forty or fifty software companies started in the early 1960s (many of which are little known to history). Two other prominent firms were Applied Data Research (ADR) and Advanced Computer Techniques (ACT). All three are credited by Campbell-Kelly as firms that succeeded because, and gained awareness due to, the personality of their principal founder; in this case it was Bauer who "succeeded in combining his entrepreneurial activities with his role as a leader in the technical computing community."

Meanwhile, Data Products, which had moved its office to Sherman Oaks, California in 1964 and renamed itself slightly to Dataproducts, was suffering from falling behind IBM on disk drive technology; its eventually successful printer business had not yet taken off. In order to placate its subsidiary, the three Informatics co-founders were given 7.5 percent of Data Products stock in 1965. As Tomash later said, "To satisfy them, we deliberately took the step that we knew would separate us in the long run."

In May 1966 there was an IPO of Informatics stock, priced at $7.50 per share, that brought in $3.5 million. It was only the fourth software company to go public (after C-E-I-R, Computer Usage Corporation, and Computer Sciences Corporation). It was listed on the over-the-counter market, based in New York. However, 60 percent of its stock was still held by Dataproducts. At that time Informatics had revenues of $4.5 million and a net income of $171,000, and the number of employees was around 300. By 1967 Informatics had something possessed three to four percent of the total market for custom-built software.

During the mid-1960s the U.S. stock market went through what was known as the "go-go market" boom, and computer companies become special darlings of traders. Informatics was no exception; its price–earnings ratio rose from 25 at the time of its IPO to 200 by mid-1968 and over 600 by early 1969, despite the company having only $40,000 in earnings for the previous year. Informatics used the proceeds from additional offerings during this period to fund development of its Mark IV product and to create a Data Services Division.

Dataproducts sold off the last of its Informatics stock in 1969, and in doing so Informatics thus became fully independent. For its initial investment of $20,000 in Informatics, Dataproducts had gained about $20 million in return. By 1969, Informatics had revenues of over $11 million with earnings of $561,000.

== Origins of Mark IV and the software product business ==
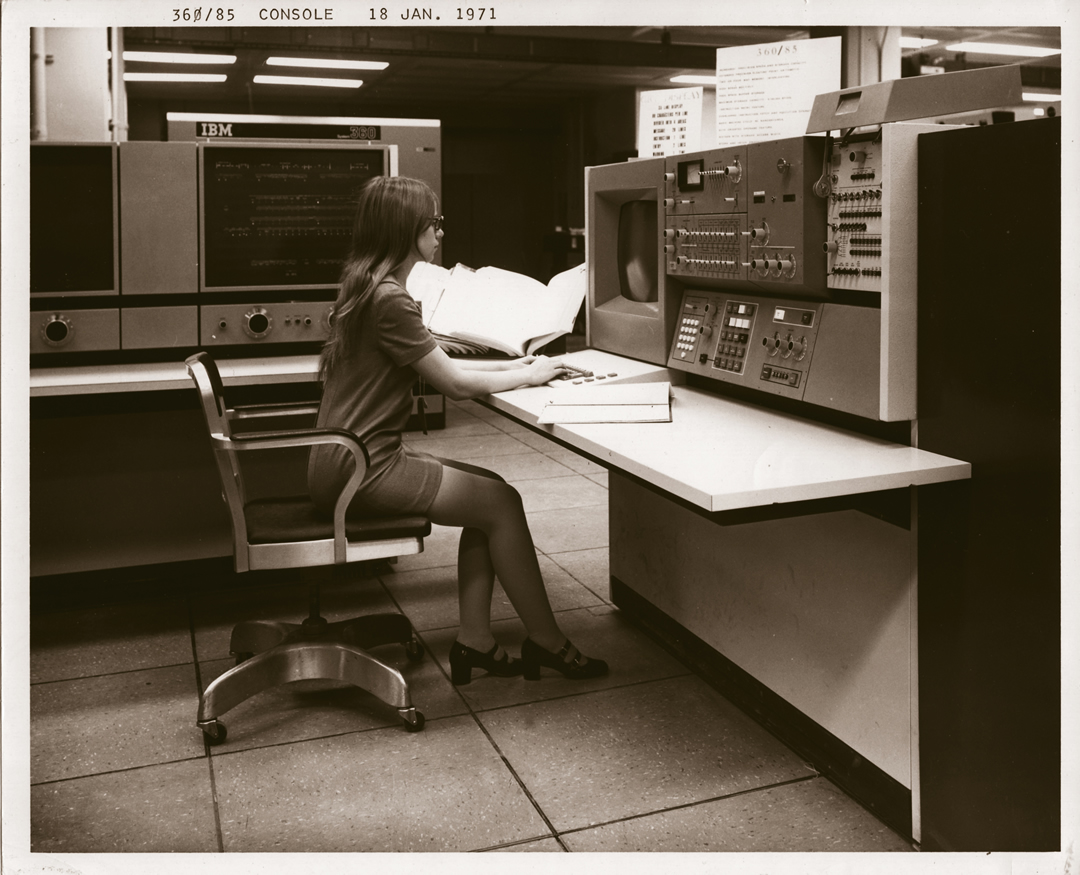
The IBM System/360 mainframe was the platform that Mark IV and many other Informatics software products ran on.

The history of what became Mark IV goes back to 1960, when GIRLS (the Generalized Information Retrieval and Listing System) was developed at Douglas Aircraft Company for the IBM 7090. Its creator was John A. Postley (1923–2004), an engineer who had worked for many years in the aerospace industry. Postley was working in the Advanced Information Systems subsidiary of Electrada Corporation along with Robert M. Hayes and others.

In April 1963, Advanced Information Systems was purchased from Electrada by Hughes Dynamics, an early 1960s subsidiary of the Hughes Tool Company that provided computerized management and information services. Subsequent versions of GIRLS were called Mark I and Mark II; made for the IBM 1401, they were increasingly stronger in their capabilities. Under Hughes, Mark III was in development, with key performance improvements.

Hughes Dynamics then decided it wanted to exit the activity of making software. While accounts later told by some Informatics executives imply that Howard Hughes himself was aware of, or played a role, in what was going on, Hughes biographers suggest that in the secretive world of his empire, it appears that Hughes was never informed of the existence of Hughes Dynamics until a couple of years after its creation; once he found out about it, he had it shut down.

In any case, in May 1964, Informatics acquired Advanced Information Systems from Hughes Dynamics. For this it paid essentially nothing: Hughes actually paid Informatics $38,000 to take it, but in doing so Informatics assume some existing customer obligations of about the same amount.

Within Informatics, Postley became the champion of making another version, Mark IV, that was for the new IBM 360 computer line. Mark IV was not the first file management system/report generator; indeed there had been several efforts in the late 1950s towards this end, including one from SHARE called 9PAC. Indeed, it is possible Bauer and Wagner, who were both active in SHARE (Wagner had been a chair of it), were influenced as to the value of such a product by their exposure to previous efforts in that users group. But the Mark IV iteration was intended from the start to be a true software product, and it was Postley who had the full vision of what a software product might be. While Bauer had seen the value of "items of a proprietary nature" from the beginning, he viewed them as internal to Informatics in the performance of contracted work, not as software products in and of themselves. Informatics as a whole was reluctant to finance the development cost, which Postley estimated to be half a million dollars. So Postley recruited five companies, each of whom provided $100,000: Sun Oil, National Dairy Industries, Allen-Bradley, Getty Oil, and Prudential. Existence of the new product was first announced in 1967.

Mark IV found quick success as a product: during 1968, its initial year of availability, it garnered orders for 117 installations and sales of nearly $2 million. But IBM then decided to unbundle software from its mainframes in 1969, which helped facilitate the growth of the commercial software industry in the 1970s and beyond. This accelerated sales of Mark IV severalfold from what Informatics had anticipated.

== Computing Technology Company subsidiary ==
In 1968, Informatics announced it was acquiring a New Jersey firm, Computing Technology Inc., a transaction that closed during 1969. This became the Informatics Inc. Computing Technology Company, a wholly owned operating unit of Informatics that was located in River Edge, New Jersey. Within this subsidiary was the Communication Systems Division, and it developed a communications system for the Federal Reserve Bank of New York. This was one of several large contracts the River Edge division had with Wall Street firms for joint development of bank transfer systems and related services, with those other firms including Dun & Bradstreet and Dean Witter.

The Federal Reserve Bank effort had begun in 1968 and involved using advanced techniques for store-and-forward-based message switching and similar needs. The implementation was based around the SDS Sigma 5 computer from Scientific Data Systems, a computer line which had been acquired by Xerox Corporation. The Sigma 5 had a Communication Input/Output Processor that handled up to 128 communication lines at speed from 110 to 9600 baud. The communications system was a success and Informatics and Xerox made a joint agreement to market it to other customers, with the Informatics product being named the ICS IV/500.

Informatics had hopes for the ICS IV becoming a strategic product for them, and while it was sold to General Foods and Japanese National Railways, it proved a very high-priced, low-volume market and there was an effort to find a less expensive alternative. Informatics was contracted by Bankers Trust to develop a version of the system that ran on the DEC PDP-11 minicomputer with a Sigma 5 emulation unit. However, the project was not successful, and by the mid-1970s Informatics departed this communications space.

Subsequently, the Computing Technology Company subsidiary produced the Accounting IV package. This was a group of integrated financial applications for companies.

== Equitable Life Assurance Society relationship ==
Beginning in 1970 the computer industry hit a downturn that lasted several years. Software houses of the time tended to suffer from unprofitable contracts, failed ventures, and slowing demand. Informatics' creation of a Data Services Division, and with it the acquisition of a number of computer service bureaus as a means of providing utility computing, did not go well. In May 1970 Informatics announced a $4.2 million loss, its first since 1963. But in a time when many software firms did not survive, the more conservatively managed Informatics did.

In 1971, Informatics and The Equitable Life Assurance Society of the United States announced a joint venture, Equimatics, Inc., headed by Werner Frank, that would develop and sell computer-related products for the insurance industry. In particular, Equimatics, sought to establish a data services business that would provide such services to Equitable and others in the insurance industry.

While Informatics revenues did increase during this period, in many respects choices about the direction of the business were forced by the inability of Informatics, in the economically gloomy early 1970s, to find investment capital. Accordingly, in September 1973, it was announced that Informatics would be acquired by Equitable Life Assurance Society, for $7 per share in cash. The deal closed in March 1974. Thus Informatics became a subsidiary of Equitable Life, with the goal of gaining the ability to grow organically and to acquire other businesses.

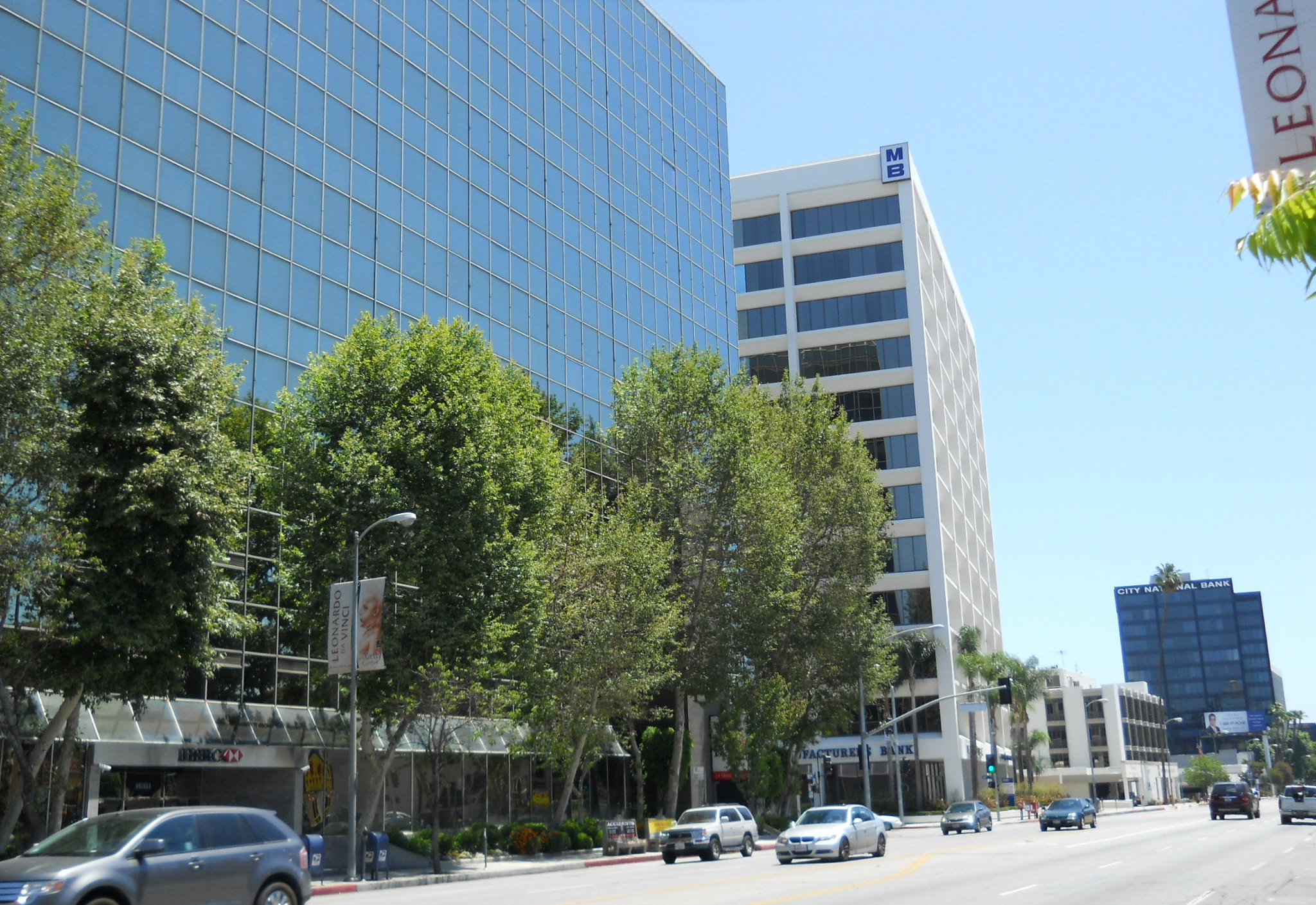
From the mid-1970s on, Informatics corporate headquarters was in an office building on Ventura Boulevard in Woodland Hills, similar to these structures along the same road

For the year 1976, Informatics had revenues of $58 million. It had some 1,800 employees at locations around the world. From around 1976 through to the end in 1985, Informatics corporate headquarters was located in an office along Ventura Boulevard in Woodland Hills.

Seeking to capitalize on the brand of its most known entity, some other Informatics products were named with a "IV" in their title, including "Production IV" for planning in manufacturing and "Accounting IV" for the financial sector. Additional products included Life-Comm and Issue-Comm for the insurance sector, Minicomm and Intercomm for teleprocessing and communications, and CSS, for corporate shareholder processing. In addition to packaged software, Informatics continued to make custom software and engage in professional services contracts.

The relationship with Equitable did not work out well, and by the late 1970s Informatics sought to be an independent company again. It had a second IPO and starting in 1979 began trading as an Over-the-counter stock with the symbol IMAT. Then on June 7, 1982, the recently renamed Informatics General Corporation began trading on the New York Stock Exchange under the symbol IG. It was only the second software company ever to be listed on the NYSE.

== Products and divisions ==
During the late 1970s and early 1980s, the company broke its revenues down into three sources: software products, professional services, and information processing services; from 1978 through 1982, the three were in rough balance, with each of the three comprising anywhere from 26 to 39 percent of the total. Beginning in 1982, the company categorized revenues as coming from cross-industry customers versus vertical market segments; by 1983, the verticals, which included products and services for the legal, accounting, insurance, and other industries, had eclipsed cross-industry revenues. These changes reflected complicated, and frequently changing, reporting structures within the company.

=== Mark IV and Mark V ===
The Mark IV product became a big success back when keypunch cards were a common input mechanism in computing.

Mark IV was a batch processing, early fourth-generation programming language that combined file management and upkeep with report generation capabilities. One taxonomy of application generators published in a scholarly setting placed Mark IV in the category of "Generalized file-management systems and sophisticated report writers". Mark IV was originally designed to be usable by non-programmers, with simple interfaces given for report requests and data updates. This interface consisted of filling out one of several paper forms by hand and then having it keypunched into a machine-readable form, that was then run by a batch operation. To some extent the goal was reached and non-programmers were able to use it. However experience showed that non-programmers had difficulty understanding the increasingly complex capabilities of the product and that only those with some data processing background were able to use those capabilities effectively.

Mark IV and Applied Data Research's Autoflow are generally considered to be the two most influential early software products.

At this time IBM mainframes dominated the computer landscape, but IBM failed to seize control of the database management or file management areas. Instead, Informatics built up a large sales force that was explicitly modeled after IBM's, with long sales cycles also a characteristic of their market space.

An independent users' group of Mark IV customers, named the IV League (a play on the Ivy League of universities), was created and had its first full meeting in 1969. By 1972 the group's meetings up to 750 attendees. Chapters of the group were established in different countries in Europe as well as Japan, and regional groups existing in the United States as well. Existence of the users' group, which tended to be populated by computer programmers, helped push Mark IV towards more sophisticated features with which intricate applications could be built, and further away from the model where non-programmers were intended users.

In the eight years between its introduction in 1968 and 1976, Mark IV was sold into some 1,100 installations around the world and had $50 million in sales. At the start, and for a long time, the base price of Mark IV was $30,000. A lot of Mark IV special features were developed as separately priced add-ons, each of which became financially successful. Mark IV later sold for up to over $100,000 depending upon mainframe size and those features desired, and that higher price became a typical cost for customers.

So unfamiliar was the software product business that for the first four years or so, Informatics did not charge at all for Mark IV product support. However, beginning in 1973, the company began to impose an 'Annual Improvement and Maintenance Service' fee. In terms of non-IBM platforms, Informatics made a few efforts to develop a version of Mark IV for them, but they were generally not fruitful.

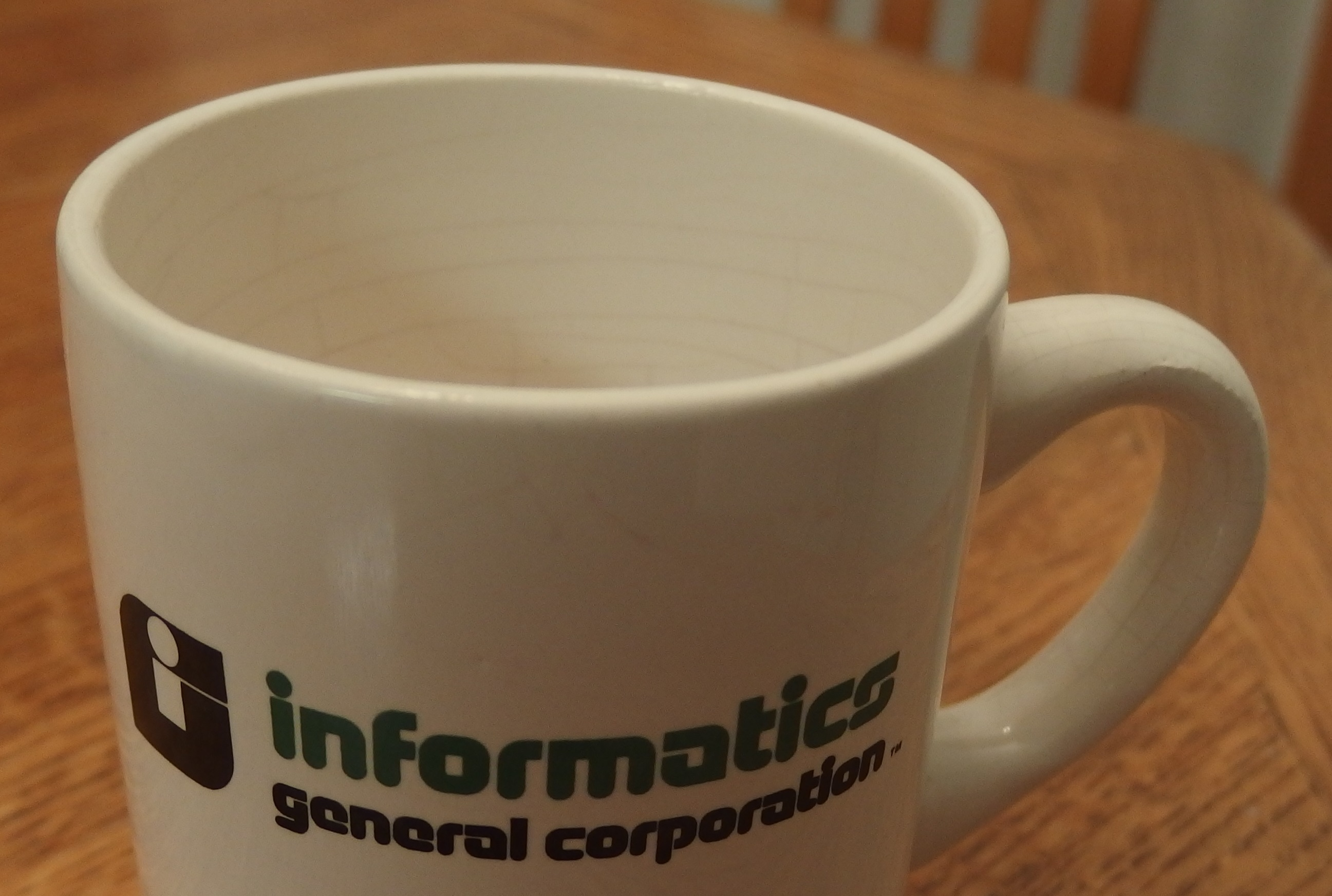
Branded mug

By 1977, Informatics had created a Software Products Group to conduct the Mark IV business. By 1984 it was still the best-selling software product targeted to corporations in the world, with some 3,000 installations. At its peak, it was responsible for $30 million in revenues per year. Over the three decades of the 1970s through 1990s it had some $300 million in sales.

Indeed, Mark IV was the first software product to have cumulative sales of $1 million, $10 million, and later $100 million. It is not only that, as computer historian Thomas Haigh has written, "Mark IV [was] the most successful product of the early independent software industry" – but that it remained the best-selling independent software product in the world for a 15-year stretch. For a long time Mark IV had few effective rivals in its market niche; as Bauer later remembered, "We didn't have much competition with Mark IV for many, many years. It was just pure sailing for 10 or 15 years."

However, starting in 1980, the technological age of the product became apparent and sales of Mark IV leveled off, amassing only about 60 percent of what Informatics had planned for. As that happened, much of the Mark IV-related revenues came to consist of the annual maintenance fees as well as charges for company-offered product training courses.

A successor product, Mark V, was released in 1981–82. In contrast to the batch-only features of Mark IV, the goal of Mark V was the generation of online applications, although initially this was still done through some batch-oriented development steps. The same taxonomy of application generators mentioned earlier placed Mark V in the category of "Application Development Systems", as it covered more advanced capabilities such as generating online systems with screen dialogue and similar features. Mark V was made available for two IBM mainframe online transaction processing environments, IMS/DC and, beginning in 1983, CICS. Mark V never become a dominant force in the marketplace like Mark IV was. It had many competitors, including products from Applied Data Research, IBM, Cincom Systems, DMW Europe, and Pansophic Systems.

Following the acquisition by Sterling Software, Mark IV continued to be a significant product, but in 1994 it was renamed VISION:Builder. By one account, in the late 1990s the product still had close to $20 million in annual revenue. Ownership then passed again in 2000, when Sterling Software was sold to Computer Associates and the product remained under the name VISION:Builder.

=== Government services and online search ===
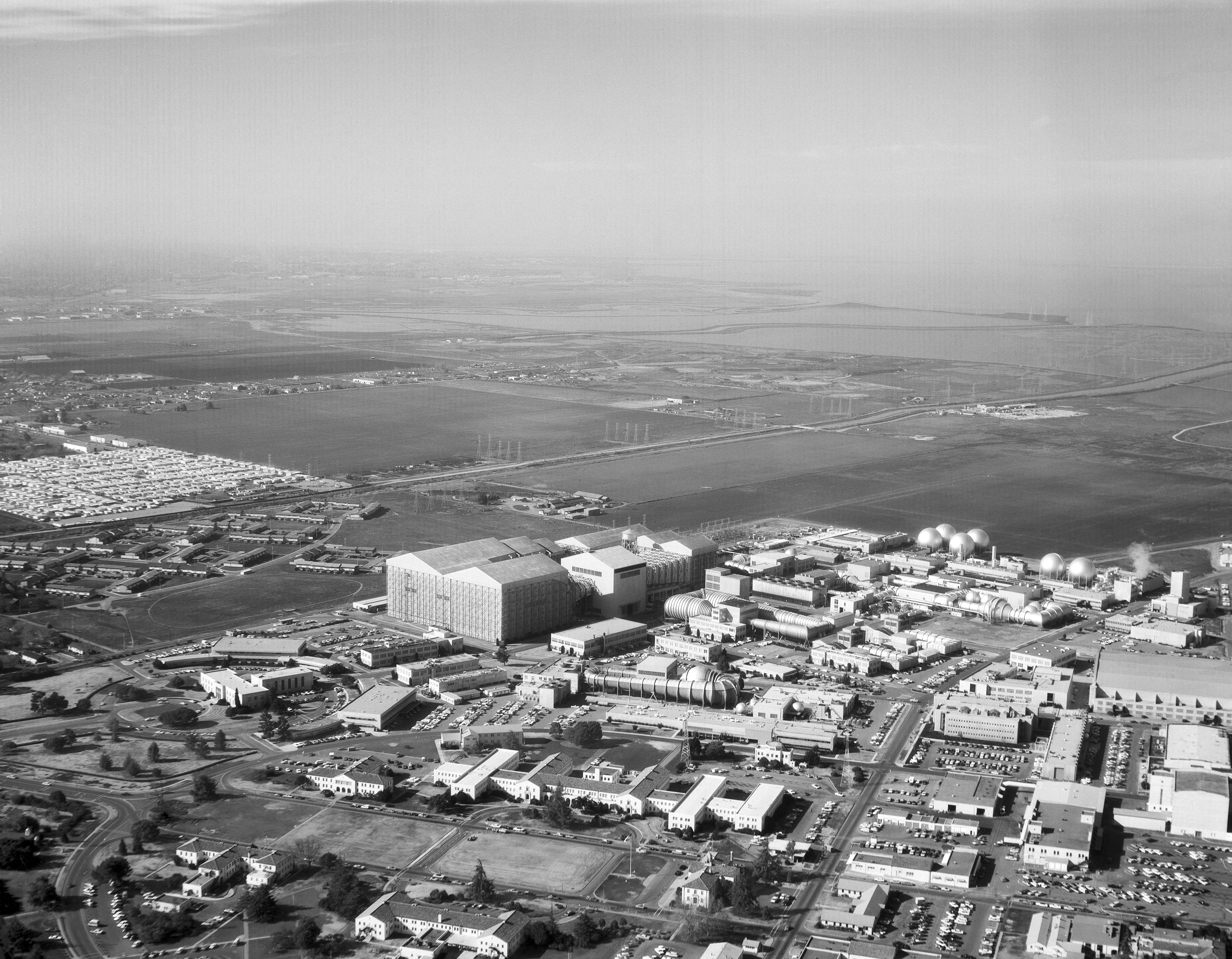
Informatics had long-running professional services contracts with the NASA Ames Research Center.

During the 1960s and 1970s Informatics played a key role in the development of online information services. One of these was RADCOL at Rome Air Development Center (site of some of Informatics's earliest contracts); this was short for RADC Automatic Document Classification On-Line, which ran from the late 1960s into the mid-1970s.

Informatics had several contracts with NASA. The earliest, in 1966 (and possibly earlier) was in support of NASA efforts at the Jet Propulsion Laboratory and the Ames Research Center. In conjunction with the contract, Informatics opened a branch office in Glendale, California. Work done there included software developed for the Surveyor, Mariner and Apollo programs with applications as diverse as satellite tracking, redesigning the Goldstone Observatory's antenna, and a database application for maintaining information about primates in use at various NASA laboratories. The program for redesign of the Goldstone antenna used what came to be called a hill climbing algorithm and was given special recognition by NASA in the form of a small monetary prize for its developers.

Work done at Ames included the creation of software in support of the Ames wind tunnel complex, which included real-time data collection systems for it. The Ames operation lasted through the lifetime of the company and was considered well-run and consistently turned a profit.

Later, Informatics had another long-running contract with NASA from 1968 to 1980. This began with winning an over-$4 million business to operate the Scientific and Technical Information Facility at College Park, Maryland. There Informatics maintained NASA online bibliographic systems, including the pioneering RECON facility. These systems involved abstracts and indexes created against microfilm and other representations of documents on NASA-related subject areas. Informatics made continual improvements to it, including reducing the response time for queries down to three seconds or less.

Using some of the technology in place at NASA, including the DIALOG system which had been placed in the public domain, Informatics developed online search services in other areas as well during the 1970s, including TOXLINE and CHEMLINE for the United States National Library of Medicine. At one point Informatics made an offer to DIALOG founder Roger K. Summit to join and had he done so, it is possible that Informatics would have entered the commercial online services world with some form of what became DIALOG. Instead, Informatics focused on government and private information services that were developed and maintained on a contractual basis.

By the late 1970s into the 1980s, Geno P. Tolari was the head of Informatics' government and military services operations, which was based in San Francisco, California.

Following the Sterling Software takeover, Tolari stayed on as chief of what became known as the Federal Systems Group.

=== Data Services Division ===
Although Informatics was always best known as a software company, it always had a presence in the services arena, with service processing and facilities management often accounting for around a quarter of Informatics' revenue.

This activity was the responsibility of the Data Services Division, which was funded out of Informatics' stock offerings during the late 1960s. Informatics spent $3.6 million acquiring a number of existing computer service bureaus with the goal of providing utility computing. The timing was poor, as the boom in such services soon turned to bust, and the Data Services Division lost $100,000 a month during 1970.

Nevertheless, the division kept on going. Based in Fairfield, New Jersey, by the mid-1970s it offered a virtualized VM/370 platform, based on both IBM System/370 systems and Itel's IBM mainframe-compatible AS/5 and AS/6 systems. The network access featured multiplexers located in various U.S. cities. Users could work in either OS/VS batch mode or VM/CMS interactive mode with a variety of programming language and program development tools available as well as access to an IMS database. The service offering also provided programs to optimize telecommunications usage and costs.

Typical customers of the Data Services Division during the 1970s included the General Services Administration for hosting a teleprocessing services program, the National Highway Traffic Safety Administration for hosting a reporting system, and Simplan Systems, Inc. for macroeconomic modeling.

Informatics still offered time-sharing services into the early 1980s. Then the Fairfield division, by that time known as the Data Services Operation, was sold to Mellonics Systems Development, a division of the Litton Industries conglomerate, in 1984.

=== Answer Division ===
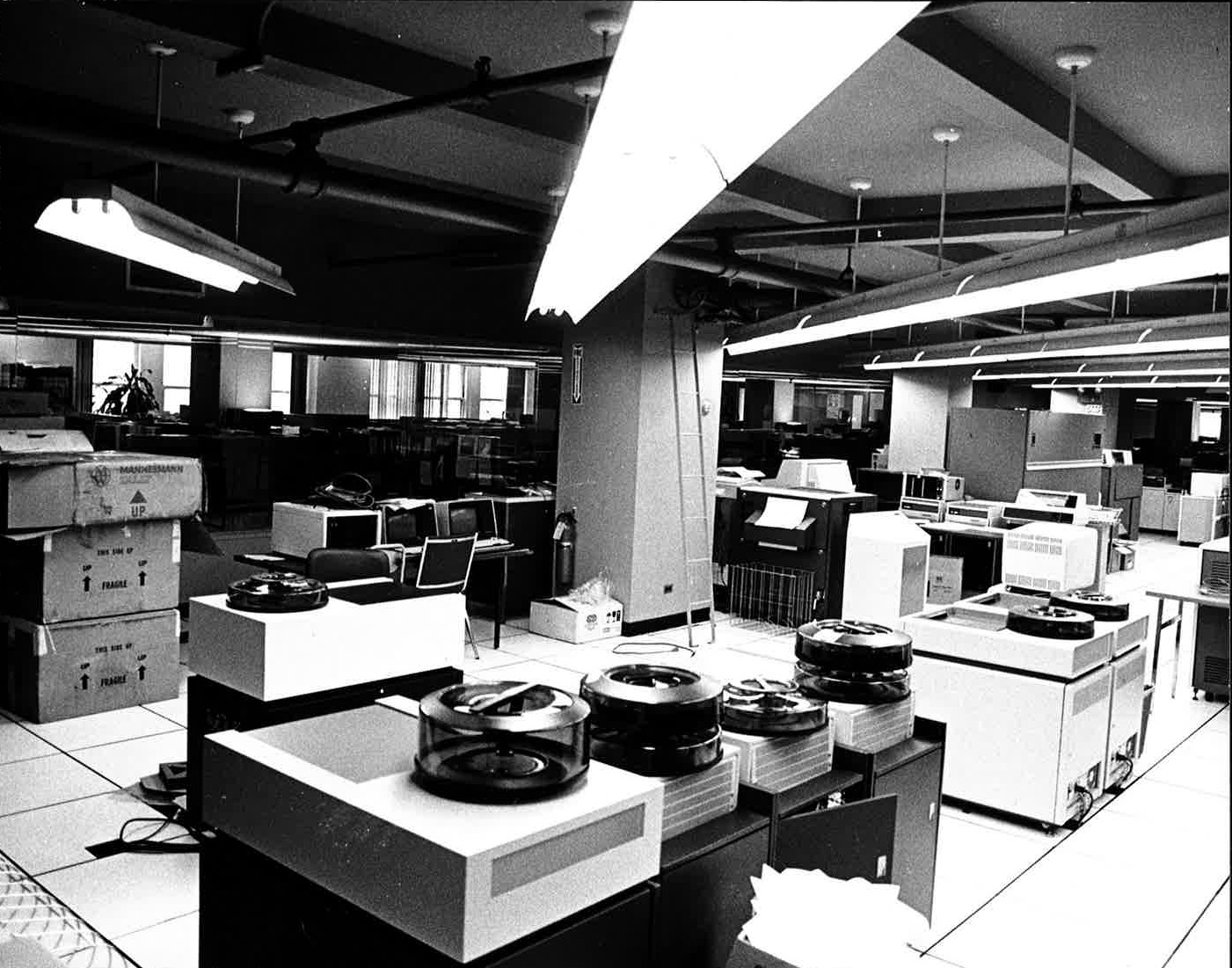
An Informatics raised-floor computer room in the early 1980s

During 1979 and 1980 Informatics tried to broaden its range of IBM mainframe-related products beyond just Mark IV. Database management systems were becoming increasingly popular, but Informatics decided not to create its own such system, instead making products that worked in conjunction with IBM's database and data communications products, such as IMS and CICS, respectively. The Answer Division was created to fulfill this goal, although at one point, the Mark IV product line itself was also moved into the division. The Answer Division was located in the Canoga Park area of Los Angeles.

Answer/2 was a product released in 1979 that was billed as a moderately priced report writer for files on IBM mainframe operating systems. It was followed by Answer/DB, a product introduced in 1981, that allowed end users at terminals to make queries against various files and IMS databases on the same IBM mainframe operating systems.

Informatics then put out a series of a products that linked specific popular PC-based applications to Answer/DB on the mainframe. Such linkages were a frequent aim of products being developed during this time. For Informatics, these products were called and released as Visi/Answer in 1983, dBASE/Answer in 1984, and Lotus/Answer also in 1984, so named because they represented links for VisiCalc, dBASE, and Lotus 1-2-3. The products generally communicated to the mainframe over IRMA boards or the FORTE package. Another implementation of these products, for the IBM 3270 PC, was billed as Micro/Answer and released in early 1985.

Sales of Visi/Answer were much slower than Informatics had anticipated. Instead of seeing the sort of short sales cycle that one would anticipate with PC products, potential customers viewed the link as a strategic decision and Informatics saw the same kind of long sales cycles they were used to encountering with their mainframe products. By 1985 the Answer product line was continuing to experience high costs and disappointing sales. In general, Informatics was one of a number of successful mainframe-based software companies that failed to do well in the microcomputer market, either because they did not see that market as being worth the effort or because the high-volume, low-price nature of that domain was the opposite of the low-volume, high-price environment they were used to.

=== Management Services Division and Ordernet ===
William D. Plumb was a pioneer of electronic data interchange who began thinking about it while at a Columbus, Ohio-based firm known as Management Horizons. The data processing part of this firm was spun off as a subsidiary, Management Horizons Data Systems (MHDS), which provided transaction-based computer services to wholesale distributors. MHDS was subsequently acquired by Citibank.

Informatics then bought the MHDS subsidiary from Citibank in 1974 or 1975 for $3.4 million. Plumb's vision of electronic data interchange was constructed as a service called Ordernet, which entered the market in 1978.

Ordernet was an early e-commerce initiative that provided electronic interchange of purchase orders and associated business documents between manufacturers and distributors. In particular, it was set up as a service bureau that would provide a solution to distributors looking to handle business-to-business transactions. In 1975 Informatics had arranged with the National Wholesale Druggists' Association to create a central clearinghouse for the processing of electronic purchase orders within the industry. In 1978 that association formally endorsed the use of Ordernet, which led Informatics to create an Ordernet Services Division. As a business unit within Informatics, this division was essentially a one-person effort at the beginning.

The electronic data interchange industry continued to grow in its adoption of standards and more agreements were made in regards to Ordernet. By 1982 four trade associations had endorsed the use of Ordernet, the most recent being the National Association of Service Merchandising.

Informatics' Columbus operation, subsequently known as the Management Services Division, included more than just Ordernet and Warner Blow was the executive in charge of it.

Ordernet was one of the main prizes that Sterling Software sought by acquiring Informatics in 1985. It was expanded greatly under Sterling Software as a series of e-commerce initiatives, so much so that it was later spun off as its own company, Sterling Commerce, in 1996. Warner Blow became the CEO of Sterling Commerce.

Frank would later say, "Little did we realize that this business would one day be a raging success that would bring its owner into the great New World of E-commerce and ultimately the Internet."

=== TAPS Division ===
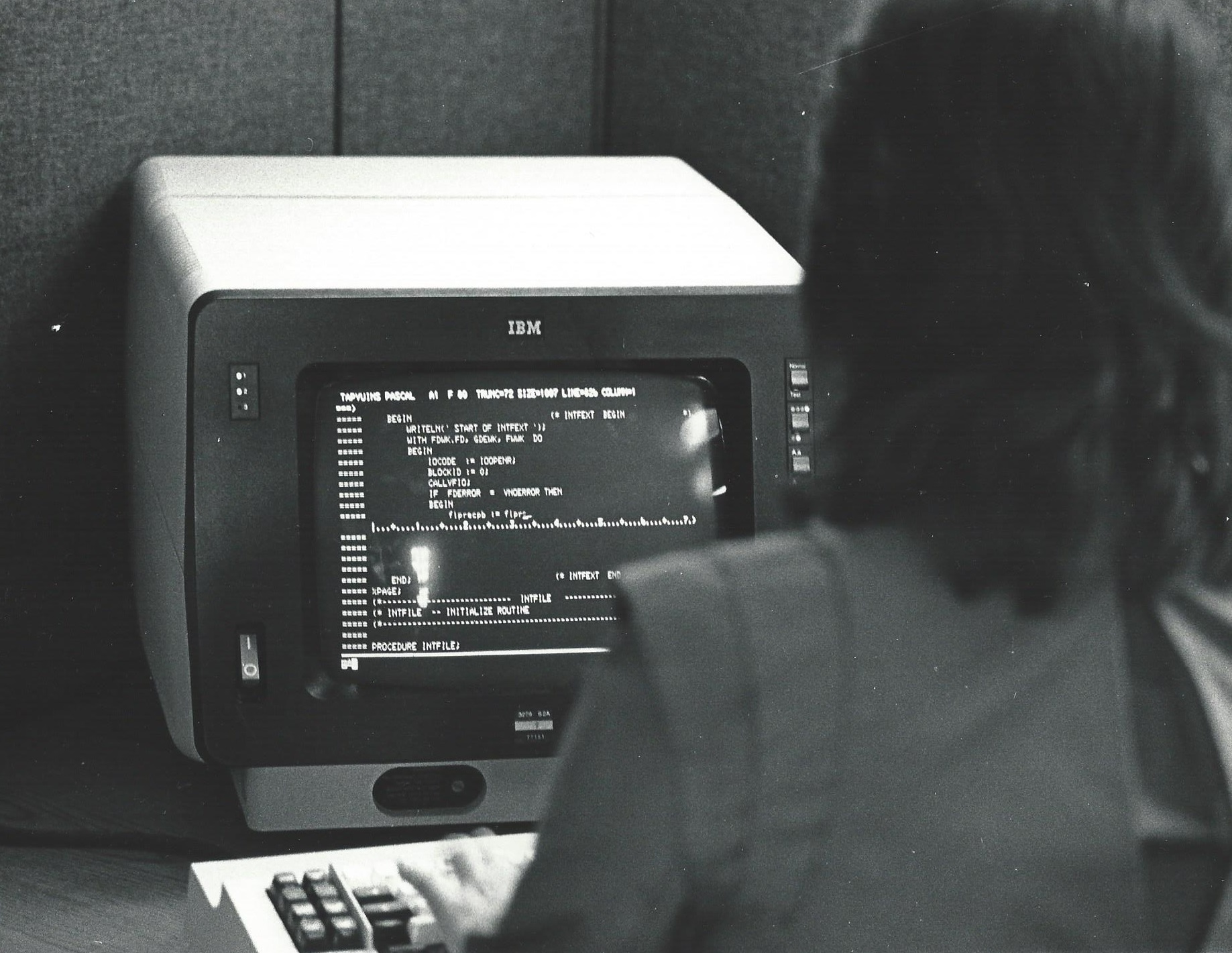
An Informatics programmer working on the TAPS product in 1983

The Terminal Application Processing System, known as TAPS, had been created by a Midtown Manhattan-based firm named Decision Strategy Corporation, which was founded by Michael J. Parrella. Intended to significantly reduce the development time for online, CRT terminal-based applications, TAPS had been around since 1974 and initially ran on IBM mainframes under the CICS teleprocessing monitor and the TCAM access method.

The core idea was to allow, by the creation of tables and other specifications, the user to create all of the functionality needed by an online application, without requiring user programming. TAPS was not only a development tool for making online applications but also a production environment to run them within, and as such provided essential capabilities including network security and control, screen mapping and data editing, menu processing, database maintenance and inquiry, concurrency protection, and network and database recovery.

During the late 1970s TAPS was ported to a number of minicomputer platforms, including the Digital Equipment Corporation PDP-11, the Hewlett-Packard HP 3000, Perkin Elmer's Interdata minicomputers, and the IBM Series/1, along with systems from Harris Computer and Tandem Computers. At this time some 70 percent of TAPS sales were to other companies doing software development, such as McCormack & Dodge and On-Line Systems, Inc., in what the firm said was a deliberate strategy to first market the product to customers who would be "the toughest test of all".

Over time Decision Strategy Corporation fell under financial stress and went through a significant downsizing. In October 1980, it was acquired by Informatics. Bauer stated that Informatics wanted an entré into the minicomputer market and Frank had been looking for a while for a transaction- and terminal-based application building system. As part of the acquisition, Informatics created a TAPS Division in New York with Parrella as its head.

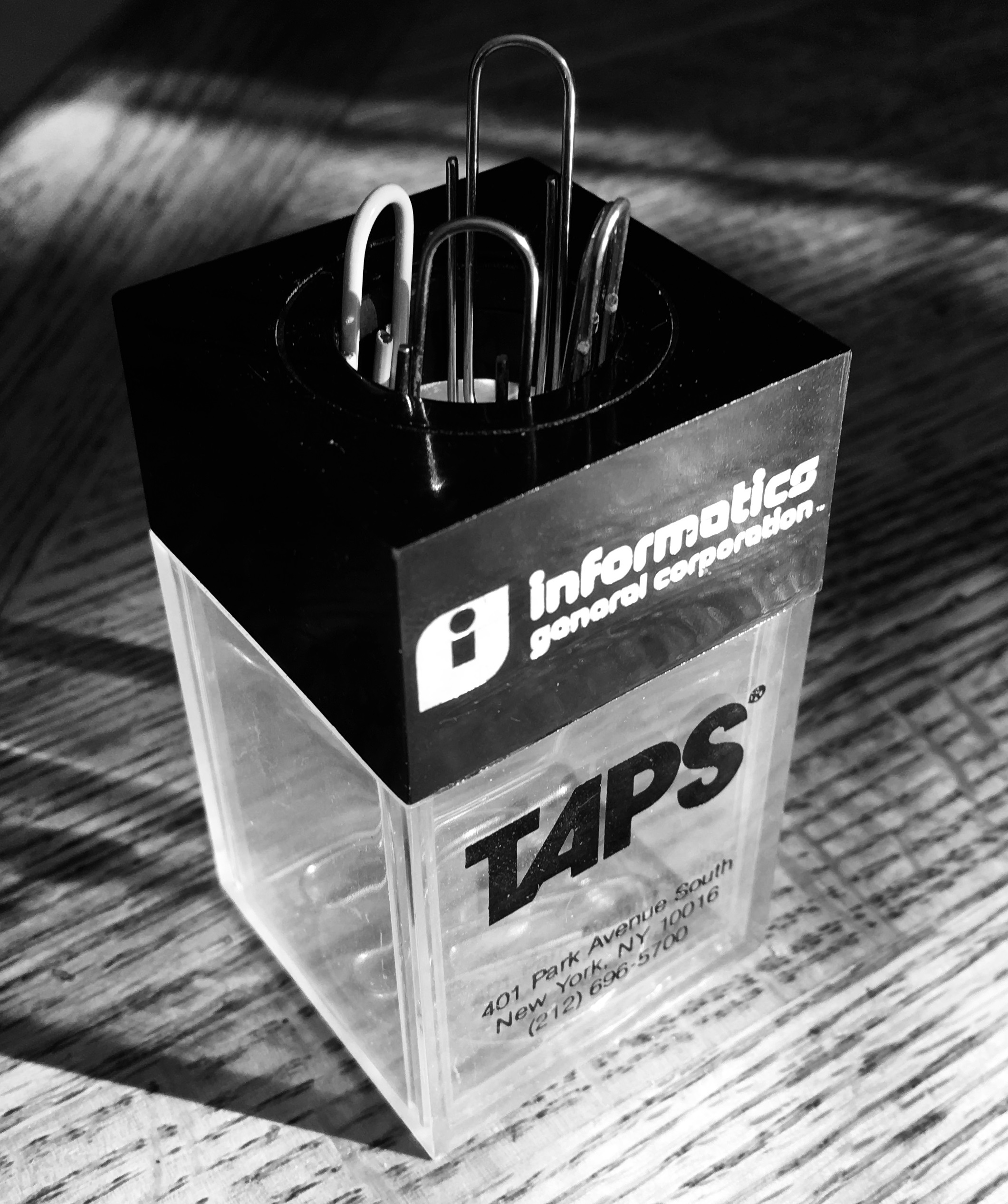
Branded magnetic paperclip holder

Freedom from vendor-specific databases and data communications were desirable qualities in application generators, and Informatics continued to stress the portability of TAPS across different hardware, operating systems, and terminal models. Prime Computer became an important minicomputer platform for the product; also supported was the NCR 9300 under ITX. Projects were undertaken to expand the number of IBM platforms that could host TAPS, to include not just System 370 OS-based ones such as OS/VS1 but also the DOS-based SSX/VSE for the IBM 4300, and even the relatively obscure IBM 8100 distributed processing engine. The overall goal was a product that could span across mainframes, minicomputers, and microcomputers. Applications could be built and tested in one environment, such as an IBM mainframe in a data center, and then run in another environment, such a minicomputer located in a regional location or a microcomputer located in the field.

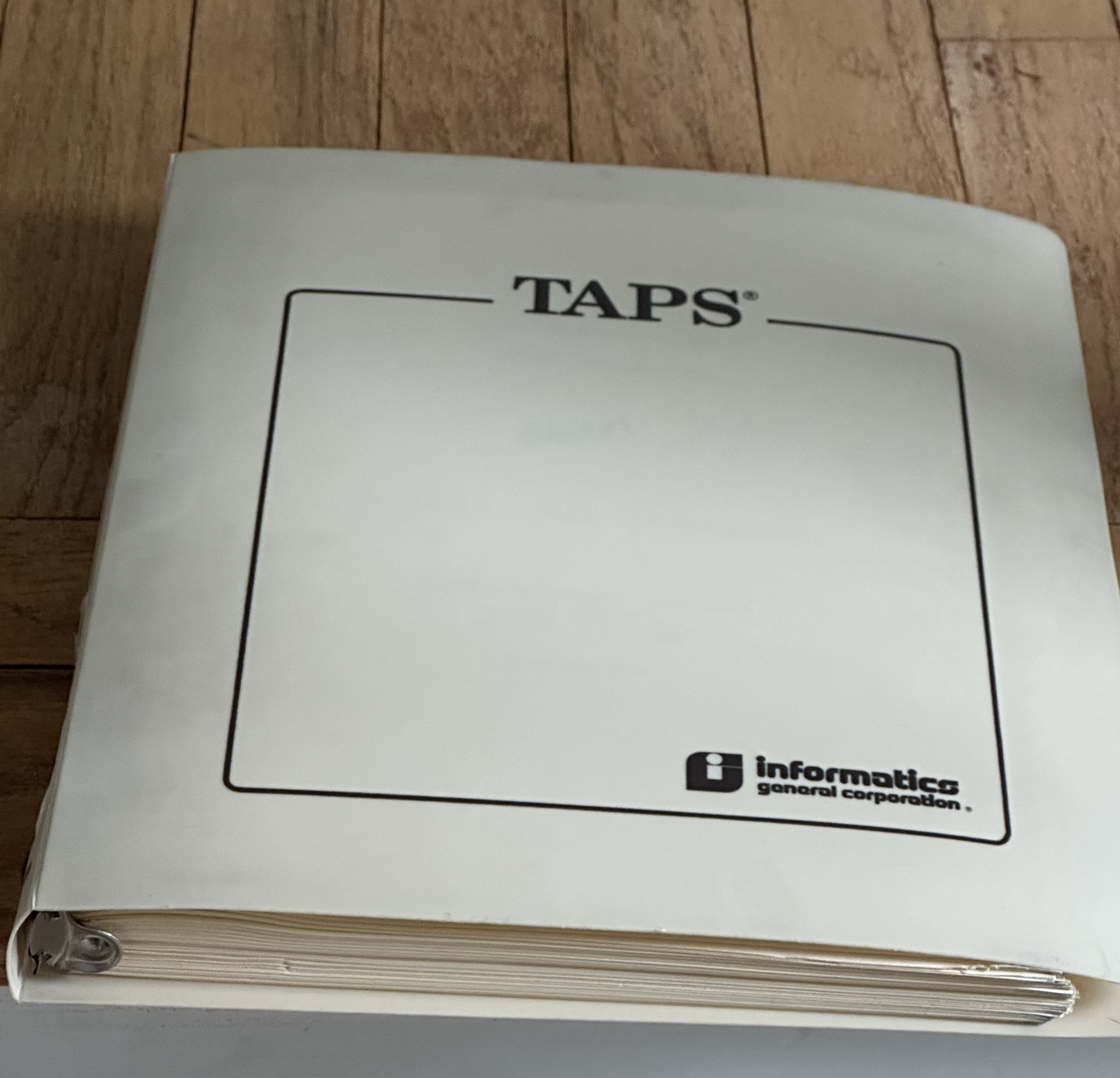
TAPS User's Guide from 1984

TAPS found its biggest market in the U.S. government, with its portability a big advantage for such customers, since they often possessed a disparate collection of computer systems brought about by lowest-bid government contracting requirements. The U.S. Army and the U.S. Navy in particular were both major customers, with the Navy's use going back to the 1970s. By the early-mid-1980s, TAPS had secured a new $1 million contract for the Army's modernization of its non-tactical administrative, logistical, and financial information management systems, and TAPS was heavily used inside the Navy's stock management and distribution system. During the early-mid-1980s TAPS underwent an implementation change from TAPS I, which was written in less-portable languages, to TAPS II, which was written in an explicitly designed portable dialect of the Pascal programming language. In 1984, a decision was made to focus TAPS entirely on the government market.

Although he was gone from Informatics by that time, Frank later wrote that "Unfortunately, TAPS did not become economically viable and was ultimately de-committed." In any case, an early 1985 reorganization within Informatics saw a proposal that the TAPS Division be moved from New York to Rockville, Maryland. Instead, most of the division's employees left. Effective control of the TAPS product went to SOFT, Inc. (Source of Future Technology), a consulting company in New York City that had previously done work on the product and was known for being one of the few consulting firms that was owned by women.

SOFT did development work to keep TAPS going on the Tandem and especially IBM platforms, and TAPS remained in use by the Army and Navy for accounting, personnel, and distribution and supply applications into the 2000s, with license renewals and maintenance payments from the Defense Information Systems Agency of around $800,000 a year through at least 2009. It was not until 2015 that TAPS was finally retired from service by the U.S. military.

=== Equimatics Division / Life Insurance Systems Division ===
United Systems International was a Dallas, Texas-based company that was building an ambitious solution for automating the back-office functions for companies that offer life insurance. Informatics acquired it in 1971 as part of the aforementioned Equimatics, Inc. initiative. From this the Life-Comm solution emerged; the Life-Comm III version in particular became popular in the mid-1970s, quickly getting to the $1 million level in sales and growing to have several dozen customers among insurance companies. It eventually became the leading product in the field. The Equimatics initiative also put some other financial software, such as the Mortgage Loan System.

The Equimatics Division persisted as a name within Informatics even after the company was acquired by, and subsequently became independent from, Equitable Life Assurance itself. It released related insurance products, such as GROUP-COMM, for the administration of group insurance plans. However over time it became instead known as the Life Insurance Systems Division.

Around 1984, the Life Insurance Systems Division fell into difficulty and was responsible for some of Informatics' declining financial fortunes. In particular, it was burdened with fixed-price contracts where product development costs had been badly underestimated. In late 1984, the division was sold to The Continuum Company.

=== Legal software divisions ===
Informatics had two divisions that related to computer support for law firms. One was the Legal Information Services Division, which was begun around 1974, was based in Rockville, Maryland, and provided a service bureau for litigation support services. In particular it offered a legal support service that assisted law firms with large-scale document maintenance and retrieval functions in complex litigation efforts. The basis for this service was online search work in the legal area that Informatics had done as part of its government services work in such areas. This unit was also sometimes known as Legal Information Services Operations.

The other had its origins with Professional Software Systems, Inc., a Phoenix, Arizona-based firm that created law practice management software for U.S. law firms. Founded around 1976, it provided a turnkey solution that ran on the Wang VS minicomputer. It was one of the first software companies to realize that law firms needed dedicated computer support for client billing operations, and from that need its Legal Time Management System product was created. By 1980 the firm had a customer base that included 75 major law firms and revenues of about $5 million per year.

In May 1981, Informatics acquired Professional Software Systems. In so doing the Professional Software Systems Division was created.

Continuing to sell the Wang-based Legal Time Management System turnkey solution, the Phoenix division had yearly revenues on the order of $30 million by the mid-1980s. It would claim in advertisements in the ABA Journal to have 30 of the largest 100 law firms as customers and to be the top supplier of integrated legal word and data processing systems.

Following the Sterling Software acquisition, the Rockville operation was sold in 1987 to ATLIS. As an entity, ATLIS Legal Information Services persisted at least into the early 1990s. The Phoenix operation was sold several times, beginning in 1986, and also was still active into the early 1990s as owned by Wang Laboratories.

=== Professional services ===
Even with the success of Mark IV, contract programming services still remained the primary revenue generator for the company during much of its history.

The company was still engaged in professional services as of 1984. Bauer later said that while Informatics had a good start on professional services, they never really grew that business and thus missed a major market opportunity.

=== Others ===
CPM Systems, Inc. was a pioneer in Critical path method (CPM) and Program evaluation and review technique (PERT) techniques that had begun as part of Hughes Dynamics. In 1965 Informatics acquired it and formed the CPM Systems Division, led by Russell D. Archibald and located in Sherman Oaks, Los Angeles. Much of its focus was on the efficient planning and construction of tract housing, but the business dissipated during a housing downturn in the late 1960s.

During the 1970s Informatics brought out accounting software, but failed to compete effectively with that from Management Science America. Nor was it competitive with software from McCormack & Dodge, the other leader in that field, and it was sold to that firm a year after the Sterling Software takeover.

Business Management Systems was another division of Informatics in early 1985, located in Atlanta.

== Final years and the Sterling Software takeover battle ==
Informatics continued to grow, both organically and via acquisition. Indeed, by the early-mid-1980s Informatics General had made more than thirty different acquisitions along the way. Depending upon when and how the counting was done, the company had some seventeen divisions within it, and sometimes subdivisions within those; some of these were small-sized businesses that revealed a lack of focus within the overall company. The divisions were organized into groups, and these groups were sometimes independent entities unto themselves.

Werner Frank had a parting of the ways with Informatics management and left the company at the end of 1982, with some acrimonious relations taking place between him and Bauer.

There were attempts to change the structure of Informatics' management, such that Bauer would be less involved in operations. Accordingly, in February 1983, Bruce T. Coleman was named president of the company. He had originally been hired in 1978 as a group vice president. However, during a large-scale reorganization of the company in August 1984, which involved the selling off of some unprofitable businesses, Coleman departed and Bauer resumed being both chairman and president. Coleman later said that Bauer had fired him after Bauer disagreed with his proposals to sell off several pieces of the company.

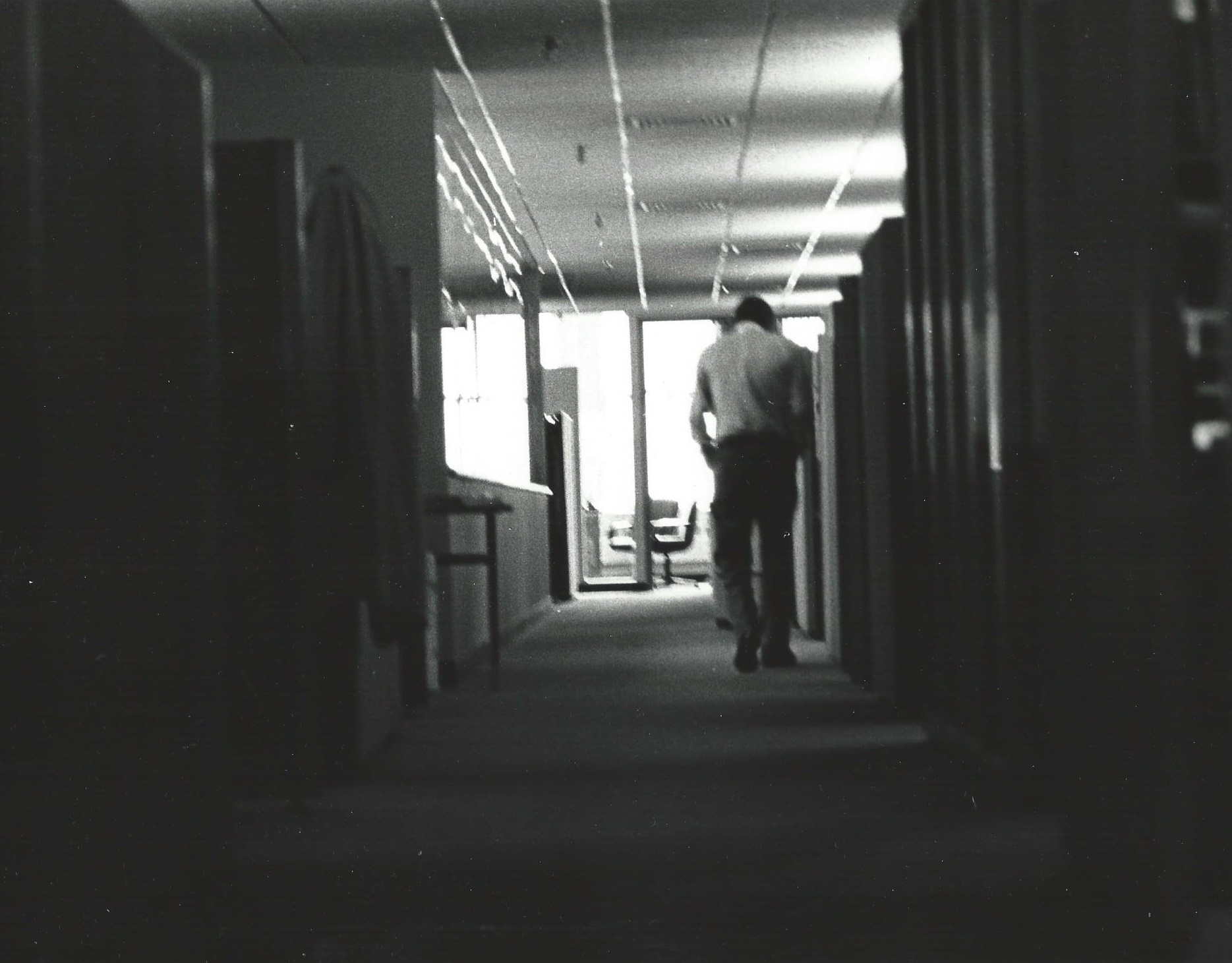
An Informatics staffer having a late night at the office

The company continued to have strong revenue growth, moving from $129 million in 1982 to $152 million in 1983 to $191 million in 1984. Profits followed the same path for most of the time, with seven straight years of increasing earnings through 1983, including moving from $5.4 million and $1.49 per share in 1982 to $8.5 million and $1.67 per share in 1983. But then in 1984 earnings declined to $4.7 million and 82 cents per share, with two of Informatics' ten divisions showing an outright loss. The performance of Informatics stock became erratic, as exemplified by a market close in December 1983 where the New York Times wrote that Informatics General was the "big loser" of the day when its stock fell 5 5/8 to 20 7/8 after a poor earnings forecast was put out, or by a drop of 4 7/8 to 15 3/8 on a day in July 1984 when another a forecast for a break-even quarter was released.

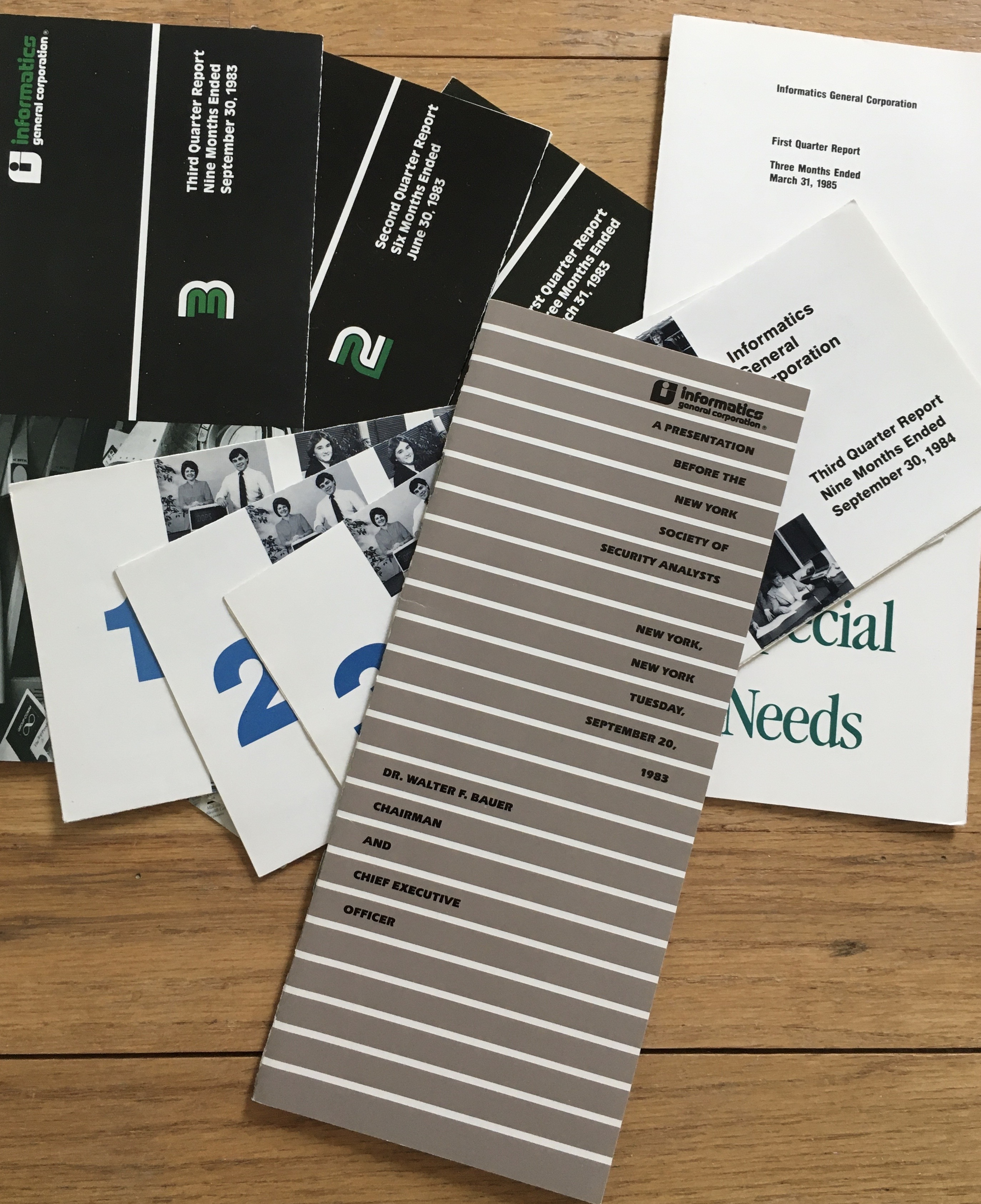
Mailed quarterly reports and an analysts' briefing by Bauer: Informatics General was under constant pressure to improve its stock price

By 1985, Informatics General had some 2,600 employees and offices in 30 cities in North America and in nine other locations around the world. It was the fourth largest independent software company in the world. Informatics had a solid cash position and almost no long-term debt. However the company and its stock was considered, in the words of the Los Angeles Times, a "chronic underachiever" and "a lackluster performer on Wall Street". Overall the stock had fallen from a one-time high of $34 per share to around $17, with a low point of $14. In the 1984 book The Coming Computer Industry Shakeout, writer Stephen T. McClellan had characterized Informatics General as "Doing too many things, none of them well." He criticized company management, saying further said that "Bauer, the longtime chairman, is 60 years of age and has managed the firm too autocratically and too monotonously for too long." As a result, Wall Street analysts considered the company a prime target for acquisition, with the expectation that new management could make it a better.

Sterling Software had been founded in 1981 by executive Sterling Williams and investor Sam Wyly and found growth via a series of acquisitions, becoming public in 1983. Wyly had a controversial background with both successes and failures, the latter including a $100 million loss in attempting to establish Datran, a U.S. nationwide digital network in direct competition with AT&T. Werner Frank had begun consulting for Sterling Software almost as soon as he left Informatics and became an executive vice president of Sterling in October 1984.

Sterling Software saw Informatics General as a possible acquisition, but Informatics management decided it did not want to be acquired, and especially not by Sterling Software. On April 15, 1985, Sterling offered $25 per share for Informatics, then when that was rejected by the Informatics board, on April 22 increased the offer to $26 per share.

When that too was rejected, the acquisition attempt became an overt hostile takeover that was later described by one Informatics executive as "an all-out war", with both financial interests and pure ego driving it. Sterling deciding to stage a proxy battle, taking out full page advertisements in newspapers such as the Wall Street Journal and the Los Angeles Times to try to convince shareholders to elect Wyly and Williams to the Informatics board at an upcoming shareholders' meeting.

This was the first hostile takeover attempt that the software industry had ever seen (and the next would not be until two decades later, with Oracle Corporation's hostile takeover of PeopleSoft). Received opinion had been that it would be counterproductive, due to the rationale, as Wyly later said, that "nobody can do a hostile takeover of a software company because the talent will walk out the door." However, Wyly felt that in this case, the staff in question would view more competent management coming in "not as conquerors but as liberators." Financing for the takeover attempt came from Michael Milken and the "junk bonds" of Drexel Burnham Lambert. Bad feelings ensued all over, including a lawsuit by Informatics that in part charged that Sterling had benefited from confidential information from Frank, a charge that many people gave credence to but that he always strongly denied. (In Bauer's later rueful estimation, the main beneficiaries of the takeover struggle were lawyers and investment bankers, who received millions of dollars in fees no matter the outcome.)

On May 9, 1985, Informatics management won the proxy battle, by a 70-to-30-percent margin reelecting Bauer and another board member rather than electing Wyly and Williams. But Sterling also had a victory because some proposed enhanced anti-takeover measures were not approved. Furthermore, the fact that trading on the stock on Wall Street had become quite heavy, with some 70 percent of its issue changing hands during the battle, led to Bauer concluding that the company's shareholders actually did want to be acquired. Attempts by Informatics to find a white knight came up empty. A series of other possible proposals for Informatics soon emerged, however; these included two specific offers, one from a private leverage buyout proposed by Bauer, the other from an unidentified third party. But these were seen as inferior.

So finally, on June 21. 1985, it was announced that Informatics board of directors had agreed to be acquired by Sterling for $27 per share, meaning $135 million in total. The acquisition was approved by Informatics shareholders in a process that ended on August 13, 1985. At that point, as the Chicago Tribune later wrote, "the Informatics name, long a legend in software circles, was gone."

== Aftermath and legacy ==
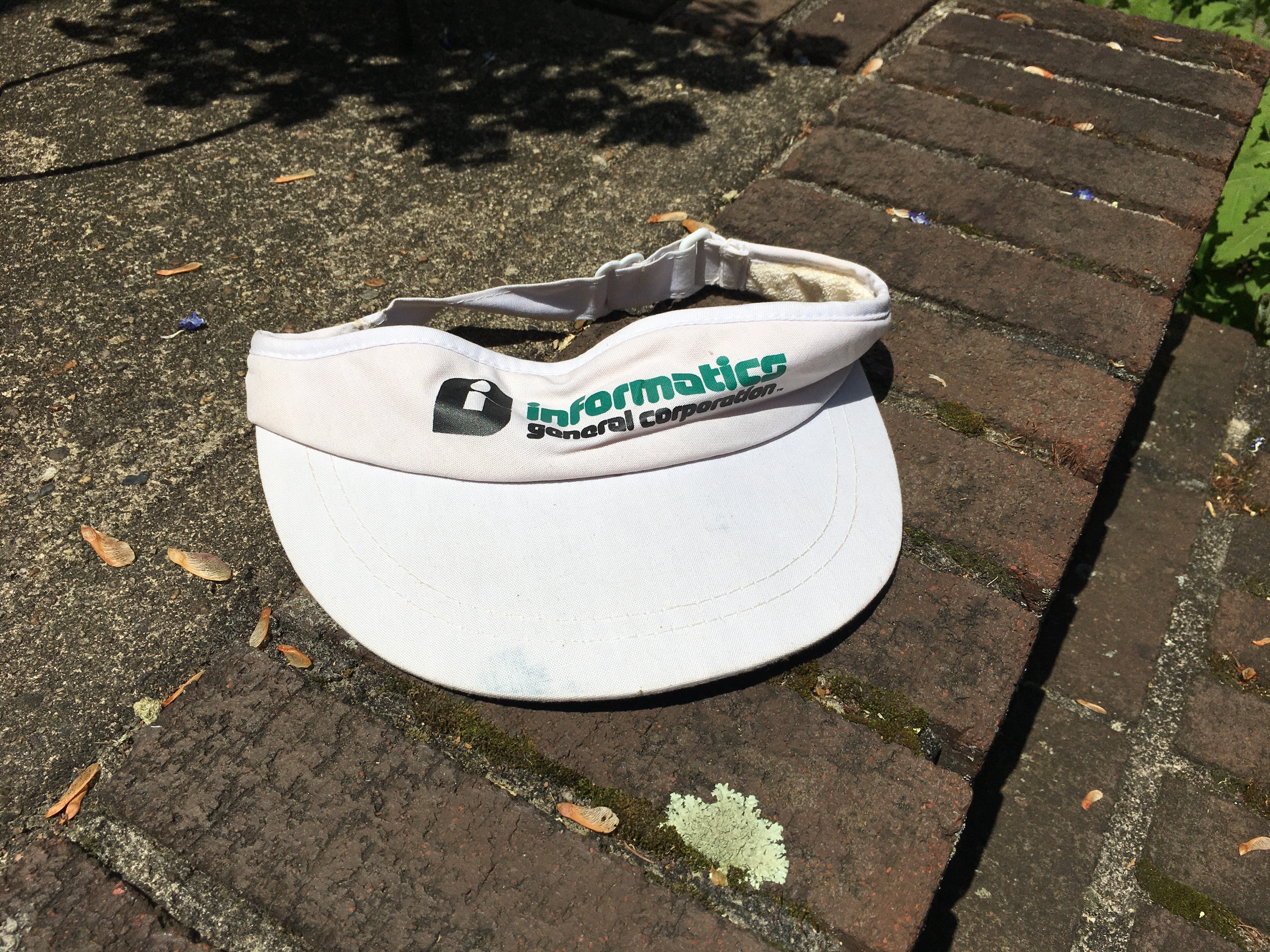
An Informatics General-branded golf visor, seen decades after the company's existence ended

Overnight, Sterling Software became a $200 million in revenue company, up from $20 million, and one of the biggest firms in the software industry. One Computerworld writer referred to the takeover as "the guppy swallowing the whale."

The entire Informatics corporate headquarters office in Woodland Hills was let go, including Bauer. Bauer had been CEO of Informatics for its entire 23-year history, in what he believed was a record at the time for the longest period that a founding CEO had lasted in that position in a company. Bauer also believed he was the longest-tenured CEO in the computer industry at that time. Reflecting on the hostile takeover process a couple of years later, he said, "I've been associated with a lot of firsts in the software industry. This was one I could have done without." Two decades later, Bauer was still ruing the combination of circumstances and timing that had led to the takeover, writing: "Without just one of these factors, the bid for the company might not have occurred and Informatics might be a viable and thriving entity today."

Sterling Software management insisted in the first years after the acquisition, and later in oral histories, that the transition had gone well, that layoffs other than at the corporate office had been minimal, and that they had brought about better performance than Informatics management had. Informatics employees sometimes had a different perspective, as some 40 percent of the staff at the Canoga Park facility were laid off in September 1985, during a day employees called Black Thursday.

Sterling sold off several Informatics divisions as part of paying off the takeover financing, in some cases keeping professional services and processing services units in preference to what they viewed as underperforming software products. Some of what they kept became part of the core of Sterling Software going forward. The Ordernet business of Informatics was expanded greatly under Sterling Software as a series of e-commerce initiatives under the rubrics Electronic Document Interchange and Electronic Data Interchange, so much so that it was later spun off as its own company, Sterling Commerce, in 1996.

The Informatics brand name may have lasted longest in connection with one of its aforementioned legal software entities, the Professional Software Systems Division. Sterling Software renamed it as the Informatics Legal Systems division, then sold it in 1986 to Baron Data Systems, a company that made legal and medical systems. Advertisements from that entity stressed "Informatics" far more than "Baron Data". In 1987 Baron Data was acquired by Convergent Technologies, a computer maker; Informatics Legal Systems remained as the name of the subsidiary under Convergent. But the legal software still ran on Wang systems and thus was not a match with the parent, so in 1988 the Phoenix operation was acquired by Wang Laboratories itself. There it became known as the Wang Informatics Legal & Professional Systems, Inc. wholly owned subsidiary and was still based in Phoenix. Wang Informatics was still active in 1992 when Wang Laboratories itself went into bankruptcy.

In 2000, Sterling Software was sold to Computer Associates; that software giant would later be acquired by Broadcom. That same year, Sterling Commerce was sold to SBC Communications; it later became part of IBM.

Relations between Bauer and Frank did not remain completely sundered, and in 1999 Frank attended, along with Wagner, Postley, and three other early executives, a private "Informatics Retrospective" hosted by Bauer, where they could, in Bauer's words, "discuss what happened, good and bad."

== Bibliography ==
- Barlett, Donald L.; Steele, James B. (1981). Empire: The Life, Legend, and Madness of Howard Hughes. New York: W. W. Norton & Company.
- Bauer, Walter (May 16, 1983). "An Interview with Walter Bauer" (PDF) (Interview). Interviewed by Arthur L. Norberg. New York: Charles Babbage Institute, University of Minnesota.
- Bauer, Walter (March 26, 1986). "Oral History of Walter Bauer" (PDF) (Interview). Interviewed by Luanne Johnson. Los Angeles, California: Computer History Museum.
- Bauer, Walter (June 16, 1995). "Oral History of Walter Bauer" (PDF) (Interview). Interviewed by Luanne Johnson. telephone: Computer History Museum.
- Bauer, Walter F. (1996). "Informatics and (et) Informatique". IEEE Annals of the History of Computing. 18 (2): 323–334. Archived from the original on December 19, 2003.
- Bauer, Walter F. (July–September 2006). "Informatics Acquisition by Sterling Software: Unsolicited Offer, Takeover Attempt, and Merger". IEEE Annals of the History of Computing. 28 (3): 32–40. Bibcode:2006IAHC...28c..32B. doi:10.1109/MAHC.2006.51. S2CID 34259417.
- Bourne, Charles P.; Hahn, Trudi Bellardo (2003). A History of Online Information Services, 1963–1976. Cambridge, Massachusetts: MIT Press.
- Campbell-Kelly, Martin (2003). From Airline Reservations to Sonic the Hedgehog: A History of the Software Industry. Cambridge, Massachusetts: MIT Press. ISBN 978-0-262-03303-9.
- Cardenas, Alfonso F.; Grafton, William P. (June 1982). "Challenges and requirements for new application generators". AFIPS '82 Proceedings of the June 7–10, 1982, National Computer Conference (PDF). American Federation of Information Processing Societies. pp. 341–349.
- Coleman, Bruce (May 3, 2002). "An Interview with Bruce Coleman OH 337" (Interview). Interviewed by William Aspray. Washington, D.C.: Charles Babbage Institute, University of Minnesota.
- Coleman, Bruce (April 30, 2013). "Oral History of Bruce Coleman X6825.2013" (Interview). Interviewed by Burt Grad. Telephonic: Computer History Museum. Interview completed May 2, 2013.
- Fishman, Katharine Davis (1981). The Computer Establishment (paperback 1982). New York: McGraw-Hill Book Company. ISBN 978-0-07-021127-8.
- Frank, Werner L. (2003). "Chapter 22: Achieving the American Dream: Becoming an Entrepreneur" (PDF). Legacy: The Saga of a German-Jewish Family Across Time and Circumstance. Bergenfield, New Jersey: Avotaynu Foundation. pp. 478–529. Chapter also appears beginning on p. 31 of pdf and cited page numbers are to those pages.
- Frank, Werner (February 14, 2006). "Oral History of Werner Frank" (PDF) (Interview). Interviewed by Jeff Yost. Mountain View, California: Computer History Museum.
- Fry, James P.; Sibley, Edgar H. (March 1976). "Evolution of Data-Base Management Systems". ACM Computing Surveys. 8 (1): 7–42. doi:10.1145/356662.356664. S2CID 14976899.
- Grad, Burton (October–December 2021). "Sterling Software: An $8 Billion Success Story in the 1980s and 1990s". IEEE Annals of the History of Computing. 43 (4): 77–86. Bibcode:2021IAHC...43d..77G. doi:10.1109/MAHC.2021.3123493.
- Haigh, Thomas (2004). "'A Veritable Bucket of Facts': Origins of the Data Base Management System, 1960–1980". In Rayward, W. Boyd; Bowden, Mary Ellen (eds.). The History and Heritage of Scientific and Technological Information Systems: Proceedings of the 2002 Conference. Medford, New Jersey: Information Today. pp. 73–88.
- Haigh, Thomas (October–December 2009). "How Data Got its Base: Information Storage Software in the 1950s and 1960s". IEEE Annals of the History of Computing. 31 (4): 6–25. Bibcode:2009IAHC...31d...6H. doi:10.1109/MAHC.2009.123. S2CID 8073037 – via Project MUSE.
- Johnson, Luanne (January–March 1998). "A View From the 1960s: How the Software Industry Began". IEEE Annals of the History of Computing. 20 (1): 36–42. Bibcode:1998IAHC...20a..36J. doi:10.1109/85.646207.
- Konsynski, Benn R. (Winter 1984–1985). "Advances in Information System Design". Journal of Management Information Systems. 1 (3): 5–32. JSTOR 40397797.
- McClellan, Stephen T. (1984). The Coming Computer Industry Shakeout: Winners, Losers, and Survivors. New York: Wiley. ISBN 978-0-471-88063-9.
- Notto, Ralph W. (2005). Challenge And Consequence: ... forcing change to eCommerce. Tucson, Arizona: Fenestra Books.
- Postley, John (March 26, 1986). "Oral History of John Postley" (Interview). Interviewed by Luanne Johnson. Los Angeles, California: Computer History Museum.
- Postley, John A. (January–March 1998). "Mark IV: Evolution of the Software Product, a Memoir". IEEE Annals of the History of Computing. 20 (1): 43–50. Bibcode:1998IAHC...20a..43P. doi:10.1109/85.646208.
- Sokol, Phyllis K. (1995). From EDI to Electronic Commerce: A Business Initiative. New York: McGraw-Hill.
- Swedin, Eric G.; Ferro, David L. (2007). Computers: The Life Story of a Technology. Baltimore: Johns Hopkins University Press.
- Tomash, Erwin (May 15, 1983). "An Interview with Erwin Tomash" (PDF) (Interview). Interviewed by Arthur L. Norberg. Los Angeles: Charles Babbage Institute, University of Minnesota.
- Webster, Edward (2001). Print Unchained: 50 Years of Digital Printing, 1950–2000 and Beyond. West Dover: DRA of Vermont.
- Wyly, Sam (December 6, 2012). "An Interview with Sam Wyly" (PDF) (Interview). Interviewed by David Allison. Washington, DC: Charles Babbage Institute, University of Minnesota.
- Yost, Jeffrey R. (2005). The Computer Industry. Westport, Connecticut: Greenwood Publishing.
- Yost, Jeffrey R. (2017). Making IT Work: A History of the Computer Services Industry. Cambridge, Massachusetts: The MIT Press. ISBN 978-0-262-03672-6. OCLC 978286108.
- Yost, Jeffrey R. (April–June 2013). "Computer Industry Pioneer: Erwin Tomash (1921–2012)". IEEE Annals of the History of Computing. 35 (2): 4–7. Bibcode:2013IAHC...35b...4Y. doi:10.1109/MAHC.2013.17. S2CID 11095958.
- Yost, Jeffrey R. (August 9, 2013). Wadhwani, R. Daniel (ed.). "Werner Frank". Immigrant Entrepreneurship: German-American Business Biographies, 1720 to the Present. 5. German Historical Institute.
