= John A. Postley =

American computer software entrepreneur

- Born: November 29, 1924; Scarsdale, New York, U.S.
- Died: April 1, 2004 (aged 79); Los Angeles, California, U.S.
- Education: UCLA (BS)
- Known for: Mark IV
- Spouse: Julia Ann (Judy) Postley
- Children: 2
- Scientific career
- Fields: Computer software

John Appel Postley (November 29, 1924, Scarsdale, New York – August 1, 2004, Los Angeles, California) was an American entrepreneur. He is recognized as one of the founders of the computer software industry and creator of the first computer software products, Mark IV. Mark IV pioneered the concept and business model of software as a product and became the earliest successful example of that model. In conjunction with Mark IV, Postley was responsible for the creation of the first software users' group, the "IV League", and the first Association for Computing Machinery (ACM) Special Interest Group (SIGBDP, for business data processing).

== Early life ==
Postley graduated from UCLA in 1945 with a degree in mathematics.

== Career ==
=== Introduction to computers ===
In 1948 he became the first employee of the UCLA Institute for Numerical Analysis where he helped to build SWAC (Standards Western Automatic Computer), the second ever computer (after ENIAC), which was dedicated on August 17, 1950. Subsequently, Postley held posts at Northrop Corporation and Hughes Aircraft Company before moving to the RAND Corporation where he worked with John von Neumann among others. While at RAND, Postley became interested in the information-handling capabilities of computers, as opposed to their scientific uses.

=== Road to Mark IV ===
By 1959, Postley had determined that many non-scientific, business-type requirements that were common across applications and that functionality to address these requirements was being frequently recreated. He felt that it would be beneficial to gather users to discuss the issues. This led him to convene a conference at UCLA that was attended by over 500 people. One of the outcomes was the creation of the Special Interest Group on Business Data Processing (SIGBDP) in the Los Angeles ACM chapter, which at that time represented 10 percent of all ACM members. SIGBDP was the first ACM SIG and Postley served as the first chairman of both the chapter SIG and the overall SIG. Almost a decade later, in 1967, to build community among Mark IV users Postley created the first software users' group, named the "IV League".

Along with Robert M. Hayes, he founded and ran Advanced Information Systems (AIS) which almost immediately became part of the Electrada Corporation when it went public in June, 1960, to pursue opportunities in data processing, information sciences and non-numerical computing. AIS focused on the development of the Generalized Information Retrieval and Listing System (GIRLS) for the IBM 704. In April, 1963, Postley sold AIS to Hughes Dynamics as a funding strategy and to increase product reach. When Howard Hughes began to lose interest in the computer services market in 1964, Postley facilitated the sale of AIS with its renamed and evolved the file-management product, Mark III, to Informatics General.

=== Changing the paradigm ===
In the late 1960s, almost all software was either created for a specific purpose or customized from a template. Software was generally regarded as easy to create and unnecessary to replicate because of the specificity of each application. Mark IV, however, was a general purpose product that could support a wide variety of applications. Informatics tried and failed to patent Mark IV in the United States (it did, however, succeed in Great Britain and Canada). The patent process was designed to protect tangible artifacts rather than "ideas" and whether or not computer programs are "tangible" was an open question that remains contentious. Nevertheless, since the applicability of patents to software was questioned, in 1964 the U.S. Copyright Office began to allow computer programs to be copyrighted, provided that the source code was published in human-readable form and deposited with the Copyright Office. This action was followed by legislation. The intention of applying copyright protection to software was to recognize software as intellectual property and make unauthorized copying into theft. However, since the US government plays no role in either investigation or enforcement of copyright, the net effect was that of removing most protections of software from smaller vendors. The legislation was strongly supported by hardware manufacturers of the time (IBM and the BUNCH). The vendors bundled software with their hardware, particularly IBM with DB2. They lobbied in favor of weakening software protections, thereby putting software-only vendors at a strategic disadvantage. This was a precursor to an antitrust investigation into the computing industry that began in 1967 and focused on, among other things, the practice of bundling. IBM narrowly avoided dismemberment as a result of the suit, which continued until 1980, by agreeing to stop bundling business applications with hardware.

In 1967, Informatics began selling MARK IV, the first software product to be offered for sale, for the IBM System/360 and RCA Spectra 70 at a price of $30,000 to a market that was accustomed to buying hardware that included system software with custom built applications. Mark IV was the highest revenue generating software product from the beginning of the mainframe era until it was surpassed by WordStar on DOS in 1984. It was the first software product to surpass sales of $1 million, $10 million and $100 million.

=== Reboot ===
Postley left Informatics in 1980. In retirement, he spent most of his time as an angel investor and business advisor. This retirement lasted for about three years before he saw an opportunity. As it did with the System/360 and OS/360, IBM had created a new platform in the form of the IBM PC and PC DOS in 1981. Shortly after the product launch, the popular dBase II database language for CP/M was ported to the PC as dBASE III. Postley saw this product was more of a system for programmers rather than an application for end-users, analogous to the role of COBOL in the late 1960s. When IBM announced the IBM XT with a built-in hard disk in late 1983, he saw a shift toward non-technical users and formed Postley Software to develop an easy-to-use database system for non-programmer end-users. DBS/Experience shipped in June 1985.

== Books ==
- Computers and People. (1960) ASIN B0007ETUVE, McGraw Hill
