= Electrada =

American Aerospace company

Electrada Corporation, later Sargent Industries, was an American company headquartered in Los Angeles, California, that existed from 1959 to 1984 and operated in the aerospace industry among others. The original Electrada included a mixture of businesses and soon faltered financially; it is most remembered as the corporate birthplace of the ancestor of MARK IV, one of the first, and most successful, packaged software products in the computing industry. After an acquisition in 1966, the company remade itself as Sargent Industries, a maker of parts used for control in aerospace and industrial applications. In this form the company was profitable and eventually was bought in 1984, becoming a subsidiary through several more changes of ownership.

== Electrada Corporation ==
The Electrada Corporation was founded in 1959 as part of a popular trend regarding the benefits of conglomerates. The president of the company was Homer H. Rhoads. The new enterprise combined a variety of previously independent, unrelated companies or firms under one corporate umbrella. It had several prominent people on its board of directors, including aerospace figures such as Donald Wills Douglas Sr., the founder of the Douglas Aircraft Company, as well as magnates from other businesses such as Justin Whitlock Dart.

One of the early component companies of Electrada was a new firm called Advanced Information Systems, which was to do research in the emerging data processing and information sciences field for governmental and private entities. This was jointly run by John A. Postley, an engineer who had worked for many years in the aerospace industry, and information sciences pioneer Robert M. Hayes.

Electrada Corporation went public in June 1960, offering 400,000 shares at $12 per share. It was listed as an over-the-counter stock. According to Postley's later account, the famous names on the board of directors were responsible for the company getting listed on the stock exchange so soon after its creation. As he told it, much of Rhoads' actions in terms of forming the conglomerate and getting it listed happened during one day in New York City.

Rhoads was succeeded as president in November 1960 by Henry C. Jones, with the former executive said to be wanting to "devote his full time to management consultation." At this point the company termed itself as a maker of missile components, pressure vessels, rubber products, information handling and data processing systems, automatic packaging machines, and other items.

Starting in 1960, the Advanced Information Systems subsidiary developed GIRLS (the Generalized Information Retrieval and Listing System) for the IBM 704-era computers at Douglas Aircraft. The GIRLS system was highlighted in a story published in the early industry magazine Datamation in 1962. Refinements and new capabilities were added in the successors Mark I and Mark II, made for the IBM 1401. However, no one in Electrada proper had much of an understanding of what the unit did. In April 1963, Advanced Information Systems was sold to Hughes Dynamics. (About a year after that, Advanced Information Systems was sold again, to Informatics, Inc. A few years after that, a further successor, the fourth-generation programming language MARK IV, was released for the IBM System/360; it would go on to become the most important and best-selling product from an independent software vendor during the mainframe era.)

As an aerospace enterprise, Electrada was able to gain some contracts with substantial visibility. For instance in December 1962 the firm was awarded contracts for cryogenic pressure vessels for Project Gemini, Project Apollo, and the Saturn booster.

== Change in direction and name ==
However, by 1963, Electrada was in trouble; it lost $4.3 million on revenues of $10 million. The firm's lender, Security Pacific Bank, brought in Dan Burns to run the company. As Burns later said, a problem with Electrada was that the management "spent all of their time worrying about acquisitions and talking to the financial market and did not spend time worrying about how to run a business once they bought it." In Postley's view, the problem with Electrada had been that it "was formed by a real promoter who didn't know anything except how to promote a company." Regarding the famous names on its board of directors, Postley said that aside from getting the company listed on the stock exchange, "none of them ever did anything at all."

As the new chief executive, Burns laid off 45 percent of the company's workforce within the next three months. While still involved in the aerospace industry, Burns moved the company out of the electronics business and into a line of business that involved pumps and hydraulic equipment.

In a key move, starting in 1965 and closing in March 1966, Electrada bought the assets of Sargent Engineering Company from A. J. Industries. Sargent Engineering had a history going back to 1920 when it was founded by Sumner Benedict Sargent. The acquired entity specialized in making precision force control components such as valves and actuators. Sargent Engineering and a second firm under the Sargent name had been family-owned until 1961, when it was sold to A.J. Industries. Following the acquisition, in May 1966, Electrada's name was changed to Sargent Industries.

== Sargent Industries ==
As a maker of hydraulic and mechanical parts used for control in aerospace and industrial applications, Sargent Industries became steadily profitable. Its stock was listed on the American Stock Exchange and the Pacific Stock Exchange. By 1969, it had revenues of $30 million. It then engaged in a series of acquisitions in 1969, including in October agreeing to buy the much bigger Gar Wood Industries, which moved the firm into the industrial sector more than the aerospace one. The Gar Wood deal was revised and finally agreed to in March 1970.

Later in the decade, Sargent Industries became one of the earliest leveraged buyout acquisitions by Kohlberg Kravis Roberts, being part of their initial KKR Fund 1976. The transaction was valued at $39 million. The full deal was tangled as in 1978, Sargent Industries was actually acquired by ORICO. This was formerly Open Road Industries, a maker of recreational vehicles that had gone into bankruptcy following the effects of the 1973 oil crisis. Following the acquisition, ORICO renamed itself back to Sargent Industries.

The newly formed entity was a successful concern. For 1983, it earned around $6 million on revenue of about $100 million.

In 1984, Sargent Industries was bought by Dover Corporation for $68 million. As a subsidiary, it became known as Sargent Controls, during which time it relocated to Arizona, and later as Sargent Aerospace & Defense. It remains a worldwide seller of highly engineered parts that are used in the aerospace and transportation sectors. In 2015, the Sargent unit was sold to RBC Bearings for $500 million.
