= Tumbleweed Communications =

American software company (1993–2008)

Tumbleweed Communications Corp.
- Type: Public
- Traded as: Nasdaq: TMWD
- Industry: Security for internet commerce
- Founded: 1993
- Defunct: 2008
- Fate: Merged into Axway Software
- Headquarters: Redwood City, California
- Revenue: US $57.5M (2007)

Tumbleweed Communications Corp. was an American company that provided secure messaging and secure file transfer services for enterprise and government customers. The company became a publicly traded company in 1999, trading on the NASDAQ stock exchange under the symbol TMWD. Tumbleweed Communications merged with Axway, a subsidiary of Sopra Group, in 2008.

Tumbleweed products were used to block security threats, protect information, and conduct business online. Tumbleweed provided services for inbound and outbound email protection, secure file routing, and identity validation that allow organizations to conduct business over the Internet. Tumbleweed offered these solutions in three product suites: MailGate, SecureTransport, and Validation Authority. MailGate provided protection against spam, viruses, and attacks, and enabled policy-based message filtering, encryption, and routing. SecureTransport enabled customers to safely exchange large files and transactions without proprietary software. Validation Authority determined the validity of digital certificates.

Tumbleweed had approximately 2,300 enterprise and government customers. Their market focus had been in the financial services, health care, and government.

== Merger ==
- Axway Software acquired Tumbleweed in 2008.
- Tumbleweed acquired Corvigo in 2004. With the acquisition, Tumbleweed gained the Linux-based anti-spam appliance MailGate.
- Tumbleweed acquired Valicert in 2003. The Valicert SecureTransport product was added to Tumbleweed's security suite.
- Tumbleweed acquired Worldtalk in 2000.

== Revenue ==
In 2005, Tumbleweed earned approximately $US 50 million in gross revenue from the sale of their products and services. Of that, approximately $US 3 million was from licensing their patents.

In 2006, Tumbleweed reported $US 62 million in revenue, with revenue growth over one year of 24%.

In 2007, Tumbleweed reported $US 57.50 million in revenue, with revenue growth over one year of -7.30%.

== Awards ==
In January 2007, Tumbleweed's MailGate 5550 was named SC Magazine’s Best of 2006 "Recommended" award in the Anti-Spam category.

== Patents ==
Tumbleweed had a patent portfolio including 22 utility patents and one issued US design patent.

US patent 6192407 is one of several owned by Tumbleweed that relates to document delivery systems that generate a unique URL for intended recipients of a document in order to deliver that document. Tumbleweed licensed this and related patents in their patent portfolio to 29 companies. They filed several patent infringement lawsuits. Those that have been sued include:

- PayPal: This suit has been settled. Terms of the settlement have not been disclosed.
- Hallmark Cards: This suit has been settled. Hallmark agreed to take a license.
- Yahoo! and HSBC Bank USA: This suit has been settled. The terms have been described by Yahoo! and HSBC lawyers as favorable to Yahoo! and HSBC.
- DST Systems and NewRiver: This suit has been settled. DST Systems and NewRiver will pay Tumbleweed four cents for each delivery of electronic information using a personalized, trackable URL.

Overall, Tumbleweed earned about 6% of its revenue from patent licensing.

== Competitors ==
Major competitors of Tumbleweed included:

- Sterling Commerce
- Trend Micro
- Zix

== Representative customers ==
Representative customers of Tumbleweed included:

- UBS
- Bank of America
- JPMorgan Chase
- The Regence Group
- Aetna

== See also ==
- List of software patents
