= Hughes Dynamics =

American computer firm

Hughes Dynamics, Inc. was an American computer firm that was a wholly owned subsidiary of the Hughes Tool Company. It existed from 1962 to around 1965. It offered consulting and services in data processing, information technology, credit information processing, and advanced business techniques and management methods. One mid-1963 description given to a trade industry publication was that Hughes Dynamics provided a "broad range of research and consulting services in management sciences and information technology; operations research, systems analysis and design, computer programming and operations, [and] market research" and that its business model involved "consultation with businesses, industries, governments, [and] institutions [as well as] fee for services". It staged a rapid growth from mid-1962 to early 1964, primarily through acquisitions, but then just as quickly shut itself down and dispersed its businesses. The role of Howard Hughes in all this is somewhat unclear.

== Origins ==
The first mentions of Hughes Dynamics, including Help Wanted ads for positions within the company and speaker notices for a seminar on data retrieval, began appearing as early as July 1962 in newspapers in Louisiana and Texas. The employment ad was listed for "males" and offered "unusual career opportunities for experience professionals in information systems research and engineering computer programming technical systems marketing in Houston and Dallas, Texas."

The existence of Hughes Dynamics was publicly announced on or about September 1, 1962. Much of its staff consisted of scientists, engineers, or other such technical positions. The general manager of Hughes Dynamics was John E. Hodges, who had been a vice president of Hughes Tool Company. The initial emphases of the new venture were said by the announcement to be "technical, scientific and management services to the oil and transport industries."

The new entity was based in Los Angeles, California. The central computer facilities were acquired from the firm C-E-I-R and consisted of IBM 360 mainframes in the Miracle Mile area. It also had offices in Houston and elsewhere.

The core business of the parent company, Hughes Tool, was the manufacture of drill bits for wells and associated products and services. The announcement regarding Hughes Dynamics was made by Raymond Holliday, Executive Vice President of the Hughes Tool Company. Holliday was a longtime assistant in the Hughes organization who was functionally a chief officer of Hughes Tool from 1957 on (and who would become CEO of it in 1972 after Howard Hughes sold it to the public).

Another announcement of Hughes Dynamics, Inc. was made in April 1963, with F. William "Bill" Gay being named as "executive committee chairman" of the new division of Hughes Tools. Gay was a longtime Hughes executive who was a senior vice president of Hughes Tools at the time. Gay said, "Creation of the new subsidiary ... is an important step forward in Hughes Tool Company's broad diversification program." By one account, Gay, who was a member of Hughes' "Mormon Mafia" of close advisors, wanted Hughes Dynamics to be staffed solely by members of the Church of Jesus Christ of Latter-day Saints; Hughes and Gay believed that such people were more trustworthy.

== Divisions and acquisitions ==
Hughes Dynamics' business ventures consisted of ones that came from other parts of Hughes as well as from firms it bought. Over the 18 months from July 1962 to January 1964, it grew both from Hughes-originated activities as well as going on an extended buying spree in terms of acquisitions.

In terms of parts existing in Hughes, the CPM Systems Department of Hughes Dynamics was formed by Russell D. Archibald and two other people coming over from Hughes Aircraft; the staff eventually grew larger. It used Critical path method (CPM) and Program evaluation and review technique (PERT) techniques, which were in use in various parts of the Hughes organization as part of achieving best efficiency. It then used these techniques for projects in aerospace and in building construction and sold those services on both a consulting and a service bureau basis. The CPM unit also did work in promulgating the CPM and PERT methodologies, giving a series of week-long classes in Los Angeles, Houston, and New York in the technique to production managers in the aerospace and other government contracting industries, as well as to private groups such as the American Building Contractors Association.

The controversial figure John H. Meier worked Hughes Dynamics as a marketing assistant, where he was known as "Dr. Meier" and was said to hold two doctorates, despite in reality having little education beyond the high school level. (Meier later rose to a level of some prominence in the greater Hughes organization.)

By January 1964, some 30 employees of Hughes Dynamics were located in Midland, Texas, doing the data processing work at the Permian Basin oil fields, in an effort to bring $2 million worth of computers and related equipment to the forefront of oil exploration.

In terms of acquisitions, in April 1963, the Electrada Corporation sold its Advanced Information Systems unit to Hughes Dynamics. The Advanced Information Systems group specialized in non-numerical computing and, led by engineer John A. Postley, had developed a file management program, originally called GIRLS (the Generalized Information Retrieval and Listing System), that had gone through several refinements and at this point was called Mark II and Mark III and largely sold to the municipal government sector. In April 1963, Hughes Dynamics acquired a ten-year option to buy the majority of the stock of Dashew Business Machines, a maker of computer peripherals founded by business data pioneer Stanley Dashew. Dashew was looking to garner additional monies with which to expand his business. Automated Systems International, a Detroit-based firm that makes computer-operated information systems for automotive business, was acquired by Hughes Dynamics in June 1963.

Sometime during 1963, Hughes Dynamics bought Consumer Credit Clearance, a credit information service that had been in business since 1942. The acquisition was certainly in place by early November 1963, when help wanted ads declared the credit firm to be a division of Hughes Dynamics. Hughes Dynamics acquired Tellertron, a real-time transaction processing system for savings banks that was owned by Stone Laboratories, in November 1963. By January 1964, there was speculation that Hughes Dynamics was also going to start selling commercial computers.

By one accounting, Hughes Dynamics acquired some 30 small firms in all. By another account, $9.5 million of Hughes Tool money was invested in Hughes Dynamics.

== What did Howard Hughes know? ==
The role of Howard Hughes in all this is unclear, especially given the secretive world of his empire. Some accounts, such as one from computer historian Martin Campbell-Kelly, seem to ascribe the creation of Hughes Dynamics to Hughes' personal desire to enter the computer services market. Accounts later told by some executives of other companies also imply that Hughes himself was aware of or played a role in what was going on.

However, according to investigative journalists and Hughes biographers Donald L. Barlett and James B. Steele, who quote the testimony of Robert Maheu, another top-level Hughes associate, Hughes Dynamics had been "formed without [Hughes'] knowledge" by Bill Gay. Indeed, according to Maheu, Hughes only found out about the existence of the entity by happenstance: Hughes Dynamics was preparing to take part of the top floor of an office building in Los Angeles, the other part of which was occupied by a high-end restaurant. When Jean Peters, Hughes' wife, went to have lunch at the restaurant, one of the eatery's staff members told her how happy they were that her husband's company would be sharing the floor with them. Once back home, Peters related this to Hughes, who became furious.

There were later grievances and fallings out among Hughes, Gay, Maheu, and Meier, a few of which are associated with the existence of Hughes Dynamics and the money that was spent on it. Authors of a more conspiratorial bent, such as Carl Oglesby, have worked Hughes Dynamics into their greater narratives, such that it was intended to eventually compete with IBM and represented part of a long-running contest for power between Northeastern and Southwestern elites.

== Dismantling ==
In any case, after the immediate results from being in the computer services field for what seems to have been less than two years proved to be poor, someone within the Hughes organization decided to exit the business. This included the activity of making software. Campbell-Kelly ascribes this action to "the capricious Hughes." Barlett and Steele also state that, once Hughes found out about the firm and how much money had been put into it, he ordered it shut down. News articles describing cuts at Hughes Dynamics began appearing as soon as March 1964, with reports that as many as half the company's employees had been let go.

Postley of the Advanced Information Systems unit later told the story of what happened from his perspective:

Then one day I got a phone call from a guy at Hughes headquarters who said, "We're terminating the company. Fire everybody. You've got two weeks."

So I said, "Well, you may not want to do that. Because we have contracts with customers and some of them are cities and states and the federal government. And they may not take kindly to the idea that Howard Hughes just walked out on a contract. They may suspect that he really had enough money to finish it. So you may not want to do that."

So he said, "Oh." Ten minutes later he called back and said, "Why don't you get AIS acquired?"

In the same vein, Archibald recalled a very similar conversation regarding a Hughes executive notifying the CPM unit and telling the executive that contracts had to be completed.

So in March and April 1964, the CPM business was split out into a new firm, CPM Systems, Inc. Archibald served as its president. Then in May 1964, Advanced Information Systems was sold by Hughes Dynamics to Informatics, Inc. The sales price was essentially nothing: Hughes actually paid Informatics $38,000 to take it, but in doing so, Informatics assume some existing customer obligations of about the same amount. (A few years after that, a further successor to Mark III, the fourth-generation programming language MARK IV, was released by Informatics for the IBM System/360; it would go on to become the most important and best-selling product from an independent software vendor during the mainframe era. CPM Systems would also later be bought by Informatics as well.)

Datamation magazine reported around mid-1964 that the firm was shifting its emphasis from software to hardware, and at that point, only 10 percent of Hughes Dynamics employees would likely remain with the company after all of these moves were complete. In December 1964, Hughes sold Consumer Credit Clearance to a new firm that operated under that name; the sales price was $2,050,000.

The Hughes Dynamics relationship with Dashew Business Machines lasted into 1965. According to Dashew's later recollections, Hughes executives mismanaged the company and did not commit the pledged financing, and so Dashew's firm went into bankruptcy that year. In August 1965, Hughes Dynamics, which by that point had acquired 41 percent of Dashew Business Machines' stock, infused it with some funds to keep it going while in reorganization. Dashew later said that the relationship with the Hughes organization had been the worst experience of his business career, adding with a dry wit, "The chances of successful partnership are lessened when the principal partner is inaccessible."

When the last vestiges of Hughes Dynamics disappeared, and the entity ceased to exist is unclear. A long April 1966 article in the New York Times describing Howard Hughes' battle for control of Trans World Airlines still lists Hughes Dynamics as one of seven subsidiaries underneath Hughes Tool Company. However, there is no indication that it had any operational activities by that point.
