= Andrea Jung =

Canadian businesswoman (born 1958)

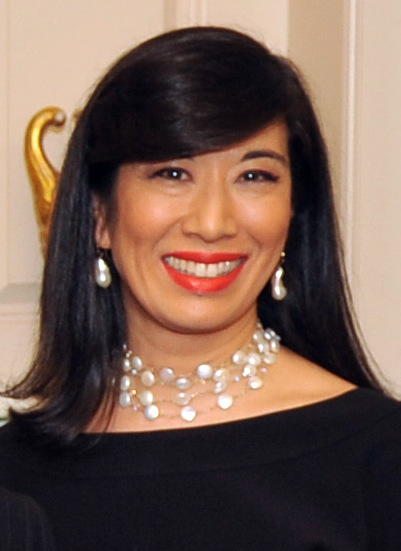
- Jung at the International Women of Courage Awards, 10 March 2010
- Born: August 28, 1958 (age 68); Toronto, Ontario, Canada
- Education: Princeton University (A.B.)
- Occupations: President, CEO of Grameen America
- Spouse: Michael Gould (divorced)

Andrea Jung (Chinese: 鍾彬嫻; Cantonese Yale: jūng bān hàahn, Jyutping: zung1 ban1 haan4; pinyin: Zhōng Bīnxián; born September 18, 1958) is a Canadian-American executive, non-profit leader, and prominent women's-issues supporter based in New York City. In April 2014, she became president and CEO of Grameen America, a nonprofit microfinance organization founded by Nobel Peace Prize winner, Muhammad Yunus. From 1999 until 2012, she served as the first female CEO and chairman of Avon Products, Inc., a multi-level marketing company. Jung was also the first woman to serve as Chairman of the Cosmetic, Toiletry & Fragrance Association, and Chairman of the World Federation of Direct Selling Associations.

Jung received the 2010 Clinton Global Citizen Award for her leadership of the Avon Foundation for Women and other public-private partnerships to end violence against women and to stem the breast cancer epidemic. Under her leadership, the Avon Foundation for Women raised and awarded nearly US$1 billion to support health and empowerment causes, becoming the largest women-focused corporate philanthropy around the world.

After resigning her CEO role at Avon, Jung continued as chair of Avon's board of directors through the end of 2012 and then as a senior advisor to Avon's board through April 2014.

== Early life ==
Jung was born in Toronto, Ontario, in 1958 and raised in Wellesley, Massachusetts. As a child, she studied the piano and took lessons in Mandarin on Saturday mornings.

Her mother is a Shanghai-born amateur pianist. Jung's father is a Hong Kong-born retired architect, formerly a partner at TRO Jung Brannen, who also taught at the Massachusetts Institute of Technology. Jung graduated magna cum laude with an A.B. in English from Princeton University in 1979 after completing a senior thesis titled "The Fiction of Katherine Mansfield: Reconciliation of Duality." She is fluent in Mandarin. Her brother, Mark Jung, also graduated from Princeton University and went on to become co-founder and CEO of IGN which he continued to run after its acquisition by NewsCorp.

== Career ==
Jung was executive vice president of Neiman Marcus, responsible for all of women's apparel, accessories, and cosmetics. Before that, she was senior vice president, general merchandising manager, for I. Magnin.

Jung joined Avon Products, Inc. in 1994 as the company's president in its product marketing group. She became president of global marketing in 1996 and executive vice president/president of global marketing and new business in 1997. Her responsibilities at that time centered primarily around market research, joint ventures and strategic planning. She then became president and chief operating officer, with responsibility for all business units of Avon worldwide. She has been on the company's board of directors since 1998. In November 1999, Jung was promoted to chairman of the board and chief executive officer.

In December 2011, Avon announced that it had initiated a search for a new chief executive with Jung helping to choose her replacement and continuing as chairman of the board for the next two years. Avon faced several controversies at the time of her resignation. The company's stock had dropped 45 percent in 2011. Avon's third quarter earnings report stated that sales targets would be unattainable and disclosed that there were two ongoing SEC inquiries. Net income in the third quarter fell to $164.2 million, or 38 cents a share (below analysts' estimates of 46 cents a share), from $166.7 million, or 38 cents, a year earlier. The results marked the fourth time in five-quarters that profit trailed analysts' projections. There was also a three-year probe into an alleged bribery of foreign officials has already caused the dismissal of four Avon executives.

Jung was named one of Forbes magazine's 100 Most powerful women in 2004. In 2009, Forbes ranked her the 25th most powerful woman. In 2012, she was named in the list of the worst 5 CEOs of 2012 by Bloomberg Businessweek.

In 2014, Andrea Jung became president and chief executive officer of a non-profit organization, Grameen America. This organization, founded by Muhammad Yunus, a Bangladeshi economist, "provided assistance, often in the form of microloans, to women looking to start small businesses."

== Boards ==
- Jung has been on the board of directors of General Electric since 1998.
- Jung was on Apple's board of directors in 2008 and 2009, and rejoined the board in 2011, where she remains.
- In 2013, Jung became co-founder and chair of the board for Venly, a Cambridge, Massachusetts distributed resource software and services firm that trains recent graduates and returning veterans to be community social media consultants for local businesses.
- In February 2013, Jung was nominated as a member of the supervisory board of Daimler AG, part of the company's plan to increase female representation.
- In May 2018, Jung joined the board for Wayfair, an American e-commerce company that sells industrial cabinets, furniture and home-goods.
- In February 2021, Jung joined the New Jersey Council on the Green Economy.
- Jung has been the vice chair, senior independent director, and chair of the compensation committee at the global consumer goods giant Unilever since 2021, three years after she first joined its board.

== Personal life ==
Jung has been married twice. Jung's second ex-husband, Michael Gould, was the CEO of Bloomingdale's, the first company she worked for after college.

Jung has two children, an adopted son James "Jamie" Gould with her ex-husband Gould, and a daughter Lauren Christensen from her first marriage.

== See also ==
- Chinese Americans in New York City
