= Michael Gould (chief executive) =

- Born: Boston, Massachusetts
- Education: Columbia University (B.A.); Columbia Business School (M.B.A.)
- Occupation: Retailer
- Known for: Former Chairman and CEO of Bloomingdale's (1991-2014); Former CEO of Giorgio Beverly Hills
- Spouse(s): Andrea Jung (divorced); Sara Moss

Michael Gould was the chairman and CEO of Bloomingdale's, a division of Macy's Inc., for 23 years.

== Early life and career ==
Gould received his BA from Columbia University in 1966 and his MBA from Columbia Business School in 1968.

Gould began his career at Abraham & Straus before leaving in 1978 to join Robinson's Department Stores in Los Angeles. In 1980, Gould became chairman of Robinson's.

In May 1986, he was named president and chief operating officer of Giorgio Beverly Hills, which was purchased by Avon the following year. After Giorgio's acquisition by Avon, Gould was promoted to president and Chief Executive Officer.

In 1991, Gould began serving as chairman and CEO of Bloomingdale's. He continued as chairman and CEO of the company until he retired in February 2014.

== Personal life ==
Gould was born in Boston, Massachusetts. On October 10, 2015, Gould married Sara Moss, Executive Vice President and General Counsel of The Estée Lauder Companies. He was previously married to Andrea Jung, with whom he has two children.

Gould is involved with a number of philanthropic and non-profit organizations. He serves on the board of trustees of Hebrew College in Boston, the board of trustees of Lenox Hill Hospital, the board of overseers of Columbia Business School. He is a Sustaining Fellow of Harvard University's Center for Jewish Studies and a founder of the Museum of Contemporary Art in Los Angeles. He also serves on the board of regents of the City of Hope and on the executive council of the American Jewish Committee.
