= Mark Jung =

- Known for: Founder and former CEO of IGN Entertainment

Mark A. Jung was the founder and former CEO of IGN Entertainment and the networks of Snowball.com, running the company from January 1999 to November 2006. Previously, he was CEO of Worldtalk Corporation and also served as VP and General Manager at Retix. He is the younger brother of Andrea Jung.

Jung graduated with a B.S.E. in electrical engineering from Princeton University in 1981 after completing a 51-page long senior thesis titled "Measurement of the Contact Resistance of Screen-Printed Silver Metallization of N+ Silicon."

== Career ==
As CEO of IGN Entertainment (formerly Snowball.com), a leading Internet media and services company for video gaming and other forms of digital entertainment, Jung took the company public in March 2000 and then private in August 2003. Jung led IGN's sale to NewsCorp, the parent company of Fox Interactive Media in October 2005. When the company was acquired by NewsCorp, Jung served as chief operating officer of Fox Interactive Media (FIM), where he was responsible for all of its internet properties, including MySpace, IGN Entertainment, FoxSports.com, AmericanIdol.com, and Scout Media.

Prior to joining IGN, Jung was the co-founder and CEO of Worldtalk Communications Corp., an Internet security company that he took public in 1996. He also served as VP and General Manager at Retix. Jung has served as board chairman for Clearspring Technologies and as CEO of Vudu. He has also been a board member of the San Francisco Symphony, beginning in 2006. In May 2012 he became one of the Board Member and advisor for HackerRank. In March 2014 Jung became the CEO of OnLive which subsequently ceased operations after selling its patents to Sony in April 2015.
