= Frank William Gay =

American businessman (1920–2007)

Frank William "Bill" Gay
- Born: September 11, 1920; Salt Lake City, Utah
- Died: May 21, 2007 (aged 86); Kingwood, Texas
- Occupation: Business executive

Frank William Gay (September 11, 1920 – May 21, 2007) was an American executive who oversaw several entities for Howard Hughes. He was chairman of the board of directors of the Hughes Air Corporation. He served as a senior vice president and member of the board of directors for the Hughes Tool Company. He was also president and chief executive officer of Summa Corporation.

== Background ==
Born in Salt Lake City, Utah, he was a student at the University of California, Los Angeles, when he was hired by Hughes. He was responsible for the creation of Hughes Dynamics, a short-lived computer services subsidiary of Hughes Tool in the early 1960s. A member of the Church of Jesus Christ of Latter-day Saints, Gay put together the so-called "Mormon Mafia" that comprised Hughes's inner circle in his later life. Appointed by the Delaware Court of Chancery, Gay served as trustee of the Howard Hughes Medical Institute from 1984 until his retirement in 2006. He had previously served on the Institute's executive committee from 1971 to 1984.

He was an active supporter of the Boy Scouts of America.

His son is Robert C. Gay, a co-founder and CEO of Huntsman Gay Global Capital and, before that, managing director of Bain Capital for sixteen years.

Gay died in Kingwood, Texas, in 2007.
