= Worldtalk =

American technology company

Worldtalk Communications Corp.
- Company type: Public
- Industry: Email security
- Founded: 1992; 33 years ago
- Defunct: 1999; 26 years ago
- Fate: Acquired by Tumbleweed Communications
- Headquarters: Santa Clara, California
- Key people: Mark Jung (founder)
- Revenue: US $4.9M (1999)

Worldtalk Communications Corp. is a former American technology company that was headquartered in Santa Clara, California. The company focused on content filtering technology for email.

== History ==
The company was founded in 1992 by Mark Jung. Jung was the CEO of the company from its founding through its IPO. Several months after the IPO, the board replaced Jung with then current marketing executive Bernard Harguindeguy, who was CEO until the company was acquired. It was a publicly traded company, trading under on the Nasdaq exchange under the ticker WTLK from its IPO in 1996 until it was acquired by Tumbleweed Communications in 1999 for US$191 million.

The original product of the company was software designed to link UNIX email systems together. When trends shifted email market share to Microsoft Windows NT based systems and away from UNIX, sales fell. The company reported revenue of $14M in 1996, declining to $10M in 1997, resulting in the ouster of Jung and the appointment of Harguindeguy. Harguindeguy introduced a new software product focused on email content filtering in late 1997. With this product, the company reported revenue of $4.9M in 1999, up from $1.7M in 1998.

Worldtalk entered an agreement to be acquired by Tumbleweed Communications in late 1999.
