= Arthur Norberg =

American historian

- Born: Arthur Lawrence Norberg; 1938
- Died: Montrose, MN
- Education: Providence College; University of Vermont; University of Wisconsin–Madison
- Known for: History of computing
- Scientific career
- Fields: History of science and technology
- Workplaces: University of Minnesota
- Thesis: Simon Newcomb and Nineteenth-century Positional Astronomy (1974)

Arthur Lawrence Norberg (1938 – September 9, 2021) was an American historian of science and technology who had been professor emeritus at the University of Minnesota since 2005. Previously, he held the ERA Land-Grant Chair in History of Technology at the University of Minnesota, where he was a professor of computer science and director of the Charles Babbage Institute. Much of his research is on the history of computing. In June 2006, to commemorate Norberg's retirement as director of the Charles Babbage Institute, a symposium was held at the Institute in his honor; some of the papers presented there were later published in a special issue of the IEEE Annals of the History of Computing.
