= Stephen T. McClellan =

American securities analyst

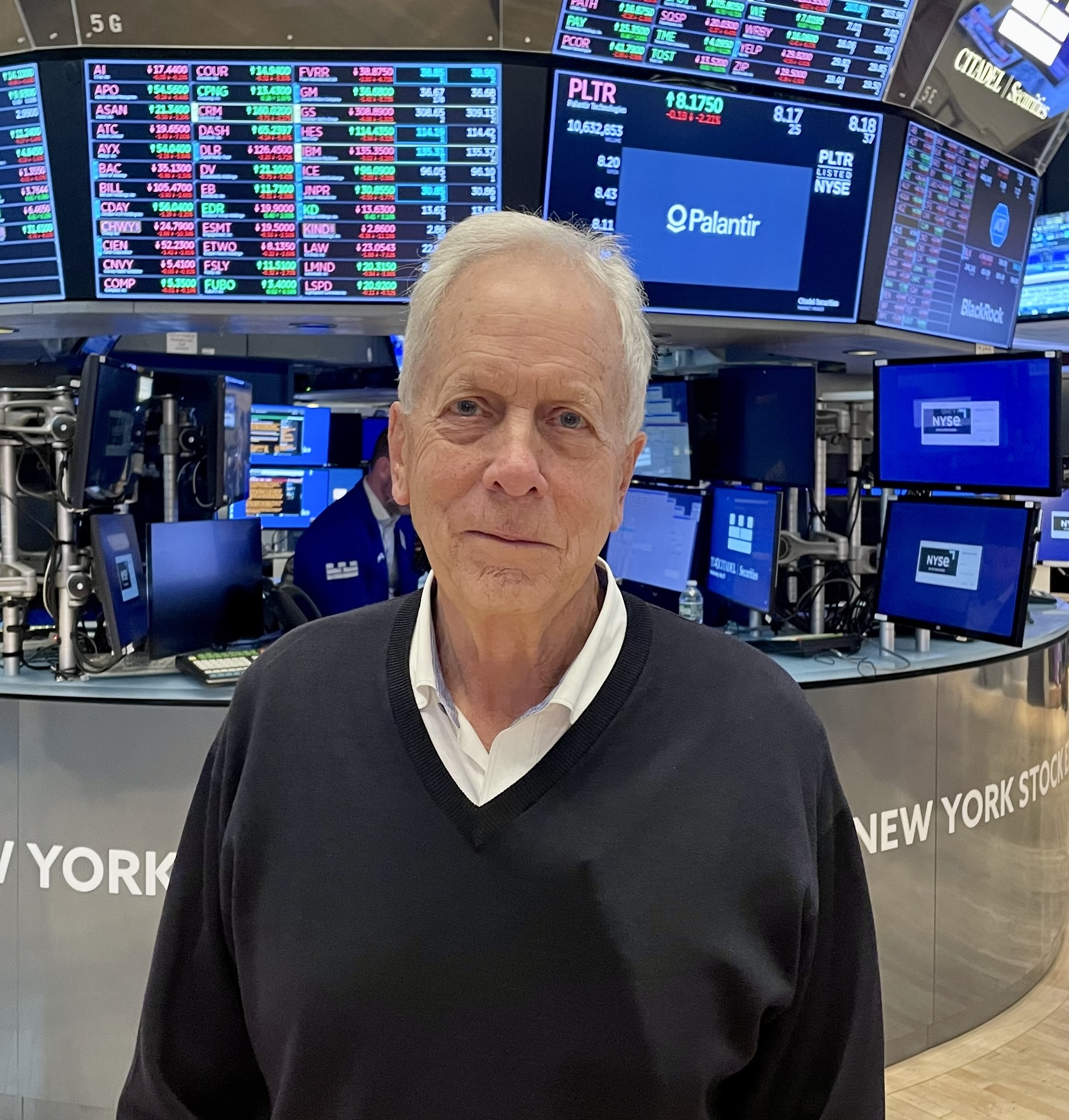

Stephen T. McClellan is an American securities analyst who was a first vice president at Merrill Lynch for 18 years, and ranked on the Institutional Investor All-American Research Team 19 consecutive years, the Wall Street Journal Poll for seven years, and is in the Journal's Hall of Fame.

McClellan is a Chartered Financial Analyst (CFA), a member of the New York Society of Security Analysts and the CFA Institute, was president of the New York Computer Industry Analyst Group, and president and founder of the Software/Services Analyst Group. He has made television appearances on CBS, CNN, CNBC, and Wall Street Week, and given presentations to numerous organizations, conferences, and to companies, such as IBM, Apple, Automatic Data Processing, and Electronic Data Systems. McClellan has published articles in the London Financial Times, New York Times, Forbes, and others. He earned a BA in Economics from Maxwell School of Citizenship and Public Affairs at Syracuse University in 1964, and an MBA from George Washington University in 1971. From 1964-1967, McClellan served on active duty in the United States Navy as an operations officer on the USS Suffolk County (LST-1173) and reached the rank of lieutenant.

The Coming Computer Industry Shakeout, the first book authored by McClellan, was published by John Wiley & Sons in 1984. It sold more than 30,000 copies in hardcover, three printings, translated into Spanish and Japanese languages. The book was reviewed favorably in the Wall Street Journal, New York Times, Chicago Tribune, Boston Globe, Forbes Magazine, and many other publications. It reached the top 10 bestseller lists in Boston, Chicago, and San Francisco. It went as high as 3rd place on Waldenbooks’ bestseller list. The book was advertised in the Wall Street Journal, New York Times, Business Week, Boston Globe, and Chicago Tribune. Shakeout was one of Wiley's hottest books that year, highlighted in its corporate quarterly report to shareholders and its newsletter to its authors.

McClellan published his second book, Full of Bull, an insider's guide to Wall Street research and investing, in 2007. He then produced an updated, soft-cover version, subtitled Unscramble Wall Street Doubletalk to Protect and Build Your Portfolio in 2009. His third book is his autobiography, True to Myself, published by Park Place Publications in 2022.

He is married to the artist Elizabeth Barlow.

== Bibliography ==
- McClellan, Stephen T. (2007). Full of Bull: Do What Wall Street Does, Not What It Says, To Make Money in the Market. Upper Saddle River, N.J.: FT Press. ISBN 978-0-13-236011-1.
- McClellan, Stephen T. (1984). The Coming Computer Industry Shakeout: Winners, Losers, and Survivors. New York: John Wiley & Sons. ISBN 0-471-88063-9.
