= Computer bureau =

Service bureau providing computer services

A computer bureau is a service bureau providing computer services.

Computer bureaus developed during the early 1960s, following the development of time-sharing operating systems. These allowed the services of a single large and expensive mainframe computer to be divided up and sold as a fungible commodity. Development of telecommunications and the first modems encouraged the growth of computer bureau as they allowed immediate access to the computer facilities from a customer's own premises.

The computer bureau model shrank during the 1980s, as cheap commodity computers, particularly the PC clone but also the minicomputer allowed services to be hosted on-premises.

== See also ==
- Batch processing
- Cloud computing
- Grid computing
- Service Bureau Corporation
- Utility computing
