= Robert M. Hayes (information scientist) =

American mathematician (1926–2022)

- Born: December 3, 1926; New York City, U.S.
- Died: February 12, 2022 (aged 95)
- Education: UCLA
- Known for: Work on information systems and information economy
- Scientific career
- Fields: Information science
- Workplaces: UCLA

Robert Mayo Hayes (December 18, 1926 – February 12, 2022) was an American professor and dean of the Graduate School of Library and Information Science (1974–1989), now the Graduate School of Education and Information Studies, at the University of California, Los Angeles (UCLA). An expert on information systems, Hayes began his academic career in mathematics and went on to become a pioneer in the field of information science.

== Early life and education ==
Robert Mayo Hayes was born on 3 December 1926, in New York City. During his childhood his family moved frequently because of his stepfather's acting career; as a result he attended over sixteen different high schools before receiving his diploma. By that time the United States had entered the Second World War. He was drafted into the Navy, and gained acceptance into the Navy's V-12 program, in the context of which he took courses at the University of Colorado Boulder.

After the War, Hayes completed his B.A. in mathematics at UCLA, in 1946; he went on to earn his M.A. in mathematics there in 1949, and his Ph.D. in 1952. While completing his Ph.D., he worked in information science at the National Bureau of Standards.

== Career ==
Upon receiving his Ph.D. in 1952, Hayes decided to move into industry, and found a position at Hughes Aircraft, where he programmed a computer to fly an airplane. At that time he also taught in UCLA's university-extension program. In 1954, he began working at the National Cash Register Company, and a year later he moved to Magnavox Research Laboratories. His work at Magnavox was related to important developments in information storage and retrieval, such as the Minicard and the Magnacard systems. Eager to share his knowledge in the field with students, he subsequently went into teaching; in the 1950s to 1960s he held teaching positions at American University, the University of Washington, and the University of Illinois, as well as Wright-Patterson Air Force Base.

In 1958, Hayes was hired as a vice president of Electrada Corporation, where, together with John A. Postley, he created Advanced Information Systems as a subsidiary of Electrada.

At the 1962 Seattle World's Fair ("Century 21 Exposition") Hayes led the training program in library automation for the professional staff of the American Library Association (ALA) exhibit, "Library 21", which aimed to introduce online retrieval to the general public.

He and Joseph Becker co-authored Information Storage and Retrieval (1963), the most comprehensive text in the field at the time. He also partnered with Becker in 1969 to found Becker and Hayes Incorporated, for the purpose of creating an interlibrary network for the State of Washington, a goal that they eventually accomplished.

A lecturer in mathematics at UCLA since 1952, Hayes became a full-time professor there in 1964. Around that time he played a role in the formation of the School of Library Service and the Institute for Library Research.

Hayes was president of the American Society for Information Science and Technology, formerly known as the American Documentation Institute, in 1962/1963. He received the Award of Merit in 1993.

He was president of the Information Science and Automation Division of the American Library Association (later known as the Library and Information Technology Association, or LITA), in 1969–1970.

At UCLA he served as dean of the Graduate School of Library and Information Science from 1974 to 1989, and became professor emeritus in 1991.

From 1987 through the 2000s, Hayes was a visiting professor at a variety of institutions internationally, including Nankai University, Tianjin, China; the University of Library and Information Science, Tsukuba Science City, Japan; Keio University, Tokyo; Khazar University, Baku, Azerbaijan; the University of New South Wales, Sydney, Australia; Strossmayer University, Osijek, Croatia; Loughborough University, England; and the University of Graz, Austria.

His research as of 2009 focused on the role of libraries in national information economies, and the philosophical foundations of information science.

He was inducted into the California Librarian Hall of Fame in 2022.

== Publications ==
- Hayes, Robert M. Models for Library Management, Decision-Making, and Planning. San Diego: Academic Press, 2001
- Hayes, Robert M. Strategic Management for Academic Libraries. Westport, CO: Greenwood Press, 1993
- Hayes, Robert M. Libraries and the Information Economy of California. Los Angeles: UCLA, 1985
- Hayes, Robert M. and Becker, Joseph. Handbook of Data Processing for Libraries. New York: Becker and Hayes, 1970 (2nd edition, Wiley, 1974). Winner of Best Information Science Book Award, from ASIS&T, 1971
- Becker, Joseph and Hayes, Robert M. Information Storage and Retrieval: Tools, Elements, Theories. New York: John Wiley, 1963
