= Sterling Commerce =

Defunct American software company (acquired by IBM in 2010)

Sterling Commerce was a software and services company providing Omni-Channel Commerce, B2B including Electronic data interchange (EDI) translation software and one of the first B2B Integration platforms and managed file transfer ("MFT") products such as Connect:Direct (originally named Network Data Mover). Sterling Commerce was headquartered near Columbus, Ohio in Dublin, Ohio. SBC Communications acquired Sterling Commerce (see "Ownership" below), then SBC merged with AT&T (renamed as Sterling Commerce, an AT&T Company), who sold Sterling Commerce to IBM. Sterling Commerce's Columbus, Ohio campus is now an IBM facility.

== Previous acquisitions ==
- In September, 2003, Sterling Commerce divests its Banking Systems Division to Thoma Cresse Equity Partners who in turn launch VectorSGI in the banking industry
- In April, 2004, Sterling Commerce acquired TR2, a Boston Based Data Synchronization Software Company
- In January, 2005, Sterling Commerce acquired Yantra a provider of Distributed Order Management and Warehouse Systems as part of its cross-channel supply chain execution application strategy.
- In May, 2006, Sterling Commerce acquired Nistevo, a provider of on-demand transportation management products as part of its cross-channel supply chain execution application strategy.
- In November, 2006, Sterling Commerce acquired Comergent, a provider of Advanced Web Selling for B2B and B2C platforms as part of its cross-channel supply chain execution application strategy.

== Ownership ==
- Sterling Commerce evolved from a company called OrderNet which was one of the first EDI-based Value Added Network companies found by William Plumb which started around 1978 and was a division of Informatics, Inc. William Plumb is often cited as one of the fathers of EDI.
- In June, 1985, Sterling Software, a public company chaired by Samuel E. Wyly, made a successful tender offer for Informatics and acquired the company. Sterling Software was about 10% of the size of Informatics. Through the integration, the company sold off several divisions of Informatics but kept and invested in OrderNet, renaming it Sterling Commerce.
- SBC Communications purchased Sterling Commerce in 2000.
- With the merger of AT&T Corp. and SBC Communications in November 2005, Sterling Commerce became an AT&T company.
- In May 2010 IBM acquired Sterling Commerce from AT&T.
