= Report generator =

Computer program generating documents from data

A report generator is a computer program whose purpose is to take data from a source such as a database, XML stream or a spreadsheet, and use it to produce a document in a format which satisfies a particular human readership.

Report generation functionality is almost always present in database systems, where the source of the data is the database itself. It can also be argued that report generation is part of the purpose of a spreadsheet. Standalone report generators may work with multiple data sources and export reports to different document formats.

Information systems theory specifies that information delivered to a target human reader must be timely, accurate and relevant. Report generation software targets the final requirement by making sure that the information delivered is presented in the way most readily understood by the target reader.

== History ==
An early report writer was part of NOMAD developed in the 1970s. The evolution of reporting software has a rich history dating back to the mid-20th century, driven by the increasing need for businesses to efficiently analyze and present data. Initially, manual extraction and tabulation were commonplace, but the advent of computers in the 1960s marked a transformative phase with the emergence of basic reporting tools. The 1980s saw the widespread adoption of database management systems, laying the groundwork for more sophisticated reporting capabilities. Notable dedicated reporting software, such as Crystal Reports and BusinessObjects, gained prominence in the 1990s amidst the growing demand for business intelligence. The 21st century witnessed a paradigm shift towards web-based reporting solutions and the rise of self-service BI tools, empowering users to create reports independently. Presently, reporting software continues to evolve with a focus on data visualization, integration of artificial intelligence, and the imperative for real-time analytics in decision-making.

== See also ==
- List of reporting software
