= List of mergers and acquisitions by Computer Associates =

Original logo of Computer Associates

Computer Associates International, Inc., later CA, Inc., and CA Technologies, Inc., was an American multinational software company that developed and published enterprise software. Active from 1976 to 2018, the company was co-founded by Charles B. Wang and Russell Artzt. The pair incorporated CA to capitalize on the emerging market of third-party mainframe software. It grew its portfolio and became successful through acquiring many companies in disparate fields, including system monitoring and management, ID management, security, and anti-virus, among others. In 2018, CA itself was acquired by Broadcom Inc. for nearly US$19 billion in cash.

== Acquisitions ==
Acquisition date	Company	Business	Country	Value (US$)	Adjusted (US$)	Used as or integrated with	References
1981	Viking Data Systems		United States	Undisclosed	Undisclosed		
August 31, 1982	Capex Corporation	OS/MVS and DOS/VSE mainframe job scheduling and programmer productivity	United States	$22,000,000	$73,000,000		
1983	Stewart P. Orr Associates		United States	$2,000,000	$6,000,000		
July 1, 1983	Information Unlimited Software	Word processing	United States	$10,000,000	$32,000,000		
1984	Johnson Systems	Job accounting	United States	$16,000,000	$50,000,000		
May 31, 1984	Sorcim	Spreadsheets	United States	$27,000,000	$84,000,000	CA-SuperCalc	
1985	Arkay Computer	DOS/VSE migration to MVS	United States	Undisclosed	Undisclosed	CA-CONVERTOR	
May 1985	Value Software, Inc. (previously Value Computing, Inc.)	Mainframe data center operations packages	United States	Undisclosed	Undisclosed		
December 2, 1986	Software International	Accounting software	United States	$24,000,000	$70,000,000		
December 5, 1985	Top Secret, from CGA Computer	Computer security	United States	$25,000,000	$75,000,000	CA-Top Secret	
December 8, 1986	Integrated Software Systems Corporation	Computer graphics	United States	$67,000,000	$197,000,000		
August 20, 1987	Uccel	Tape management systems, job scheduling, rerun/restart, mainframe security	United States	$870,000,000	$2.466×10^{9}	Unicenter CA-1, CA-7, CA-11, CA-ACF2	
October 14, 1988	Applied Data Research	Flowcharting software, database management systems	United States	$170,000,000	$463,000,000	CA-Datacom/DB	
December 25, 1989	Cullinet	Database management system	United States	$300,000,000	$779,000,000	CA-IDMS	
September 27, 1991	On-Line Software International	Debuggers	United States	$120,000,000	$284,000,000		
October 30, 1991	Pansophic Systems	Change management	United States	$300,000,000	$709,000,000	CA-Panvalet	
November 12, 1991	Access Technology	VAX (division of H&R Block)	United States	Undisclosed	Undisclosed		
May 6, 1992	Nantucket Corporation	Xbase	United States	$80,000,000 (estimated)	$184,000,000 (estimated)	CA-Clipper	
September 1992	Glockenspiel Ltd.	C++ compiler	Ireland	Undisclosed	Undisclosed	Aspen	
June 24, 1994	ASK Group	Unix database	United States	$308,700,000	$671,000,000	Ingres	
July 29, 1995	Legent Corporation		United States	$1,740,000,000– $1,800,000,000	$3.676×10^{9}– 3.803×10^{9}		
November 12, 1996	Cheyenne Software	Backup	United States	$1,200,000,000	$2.463×10^{9}	CA-ARCserve	
November 12, 1997	Avalan Technology	Remote monitoring and management	United States	Undisclosed	Undisclosed		
December 18, 1997	AI Ware	Artificial intelligence	United States	Undisclosed	Undisclosed		
August 5, 1998	Realogic	Consulting	United States	Undisclosed	Undisclosed	Global Professional Services Division	
September 2, 1998	QXCOM	Database management for Lotus Notes	United States	Undisclosed	Undisclosed	Unicenter TNG Lotus Notes/Domino	
October 29, 1998	Viewpoint DataLabs International	3D-CGI model and image libraries	United States	Undisclosed	Undisclosed		
November 24, 1998	LDA Systems	Consulting	United States	Undisclosed	Undisclosed	Global Professional Services Division	
March 25, 1999	Computer Management Sciences	Consulting	United States	$415,000,000	$802,000,000		
June 7, 1999	Platinum Technology	Consulting	United States	$3,500,000,000	$6.764×10^{9}		
March 29, 2000	Applied Management Systems	Federal e-business software	United States	Undisclosed	Undisclosed		
April 4, 2000	Sterling Software	Network management	United States	$3,910,000,000	$7.310×10^{9}		
February 3, 2003	Netreon	Storage area network management	United States	Undisclosed	Undisclosed	BrightStor SAN Designer	
July 2003	SilentRunner	Network monitoring	United States	Undisclosed	Undisclosed		
March 11, 2004	Miramar Systems	PC migration	United States	Undisclosed	Undisclosed	BrightStor SAN Designer	
August 16, 2004	PestPatrol	Anti-spyware	United States	Undisclosed	Undisclosed	CA Anti-Spyware	
October 23, 2004	Netegrity	Network security	United States	$430,000,000	$733,000,000	eTrust	
June 7, 2005	Concord Communications	Network management	United States	$350,000,000	$577,000,000	Spectrum Network Management	
June 27, 2005	Tiny Software	Personal firewall software	United States	Undisclosed	Undisclosed	CA Personal Firewall	
July 29, 2005	Niku Corporation	IT governance	United States	$350,000,000	$577,000,000	CA PPM	
October 17, 2005	iLumin	E-mail archiving	United States	Undisclosed	Undisclosed	BrightStor	
January 11, 2006	Control-F1 Corporation	Service management	United States	Undisclosed	Undisclosed		
January 5, 2006	Wily Technology	Application performance management	United States	$375,000,000	$599,000,000		
May 9, 2006	Cybermation	Mainframe management	Canada	$75,000,000	$120,000,000		
June 13, 2006	MDY Group	Records retention management	United States	Undisclosed	Undisclosed		
July 11, 2006	XOSoft	Backup	United States	Undisclosed	Undisclosed	CA-ARCserve	
September 27, 2006	Cendura	Application management	United States	Undisclosed	Undisclosed		
October 7, 2008	IDFocus	Identity management	United States	Undisclosed	Undisclosed		
November 13, 2008	Eurekify	Role-based access control	Israel	Undisclosed	Undisclosed		
January 5, 2009	Orchestria	Data security	United States	Undisclosed	Undisclosed		
November 19, 2009	NetQoS	Network quality of service	United States	Undisclosed	Undisclosed	CA NetQoS Super Agent	
January 11, 2010	Oblicore	Service level management	United States	Undisclosed	Undisclosed		
June 2, 2009	Cassatt Corporation	Data center automation	United States	Undisclosed	Undisclosed		
February 24, 2010	3tera	Cloud computing	United States	Undisclosed	Undisclosed	CA Spectrum Infrastructure Manager	
March 11, 2010	Nimsoft	Application monitoring	United States	$350,000,000	$517,000,000		
August 12, 2010	4Base Technology	Cloud computing consulting	United States	Undisclosed	Undisclosed	Global Virtualization and Cloud Consulting Team	
August 30, 2010	Arcot, Inc.	Authentication	United States	$200,000,000	$295,000,000	SiteMinder	
November 2, 2010	Hyperformix	Capacity planning	United States	Undisclosed	Undisclosed		
August 16, 2011	Itko	Service virtualization and API testing	United States	$330,000,000	$472,000,000	CA LISA, DevTest Solutions	
August 16, 2011	WatchMouse	Website monitoring	Netherlands	Undisclosed	Undisclosed	CA APM Cloudmonitor	
April 22, 2013	Layer 7 Technologies	API management	Canada	$155,000,000	$214,000,000		
April 22, 2013	Nolio	Application release automation	Israel	$40,000,000	$55,000,000	CA Release Automation	
May 27, 2015	Rally Software Development	Cloud-based agile development management platform	United States	$480,000,000	$652,000,000	CA Agile Central	
August 17, 2015	Xceedium	Privileged identity and access management	United States	Undisclosed	Undisclosed		
June 4, 2015	Grid Tools	Enterprise test data management, automated test design, and optimization software	United Kingdom	Undisclosed	Undisclosed		
June 8, 2015	IdMLogic	Identity management applications	Israel	Undisclosed	Undisclosed		
November 15, 2016	Mobile System 7	User behavior analytics and security	United States	Undisclosed	Undisclosed		
October 12, 2016	BlazeMeter	SaaS-based open-source test execution platform	Israel	Undisclosed	Undisclosed		
December 1, 2016	Automic	Business automation	Austria	$635,000,000	$852,000,000		
March 6, 2017	Veracode	SaaS-based secure devops platform provider	United States	$614,000,000	$806,000,000		
September 28, 2017	Runscope	API monitoring	United States	Undisclosed	Undisclosed		
April 9, 2018	SourceClear	Software security tooling and automation	United States	Undisclosed	Undisclosed		
