= Stephen Richards (business executive) =

Business person

Stephen D. Richards is a New Zealand-born technology industry business leader who rose through the ranks of Computer Associates International, to become the Executive Vice President responsible for Worldwide Sales. His role in the company's 35 day month accounting scandal led to his resignation; he was the second CA executive to be indicted and sentenced.

As part of the Harvard Business School curriculum, A Letter from Prison by Professor Eugene Soltes briefly details the history of the case and Stephen Richards insights into the financial management practices that saw him imprisoned.

== Early life and family ==
Stephen Donald Richards was born in Lower Hutt, New Zealand on February 7, 1965, and is the oldest of three siblings. He attended Upper Hutt College, and spent two years at Hawthorne Adventist High School before attending Avondale College where he studied business. He graduated in 1987 with a Bachelor of Business degree. Richards has been married twice, and has five children.

== Career ==
After graduating from Avondale College with a degree in Business Administration he spent a short period of time at Ernst & Whinney (now Ernst & Young), and then began his career at Computer Associates beginning at the helpdesk in Sydney, Australia as a Telephone Support Technician in 1988, Post-Sales Technician in 1989, Pre-Sales Consultant in 1990, Sales Executive in 1991, State Manager (Queensland) 1992, managing director (New Zealand) 1993, managing director (Australia and New Zealand) 1995, Senior Vice President – Sales (North East, South East, South Central US and Pacific Rim) 1998, Senior Vice President – Sales North America 1999, and Executive Vice President responsible for Worldwide Sales in New York in 2000. He remained in that position until his resignation in 2004.

He was subsequently CEO of MetiLinx and then Vertigo Software in California from 2004 to 2006.

== Charges ==
Indicted on fraud charges in 2004, along with Computer Associates CEO Sanjay Kumar, he was subsequently sentenced to seven years in jail in 2006. Beginning in 2007 he spent 44 months in Taft Correctional Institution in Taft, California, before being re-sentenced to time served in 2010.

=== Step by step ===
On September 22, 2004, the Securities and Exchange Commission filed securities fraud charges against Computer Associates International, Inc., and three executives; Sanjay Kumar – CEO and Chairman, Stephen Richards – Executive Vice President, Ira Zar – Chief Financial Officer and Steven Woghin – General Counsel. Although widely blamed, no charges were ever filed against the founder and CEO Charles Wang.

"The Commission's complaint against Computer Associates alleges that, based on this conduct, the company violated Section 17(a) of the Securities Act of 1933 ("Securities Act"), Sections 10(b), 13(a), 13(b)(2)(A) and 13(b)(2)(B) of the Securities Exchange Act of 1934 ("Exchange Act"), and Rules 10b-5, 12b-20, 13a-1 and 13a-13 thereunder. The Commission's complaints against defendants Kumar, Richards and Woghin allege that, based on this conduct, they violated Section 17(a) of the Securities Act, Sections 10(b) and 13(b)(5) of the Exchange Act, and Rules 10(b)-5 and 13b2-1 thereunder. The complaints further allege that under Section 20(e) of the Exchange Act, Kumar, Richards and Woghin aided and abetted Computer Associates' violations of Sections 10(b), 13(a), 13(b)(2)(A), and 13(b)(2)(B) of the Exchange Act and Rules 10b-5, 12b-20, 13a-1 and 13a-13 thereunder."

=== The 35 day month ===
The fraud, "what came to be known by Computer Associates employees as a 35-day month", involved backdating of contracts to prop up quarterly revenues and earnings figures to meet market expectations.

The SEC said the scheme began in 1998, possibly earlier, and continued through September 2000. In all, the company prematurely reported $3.3 billion in revenues from 363 software contracts. This violated Generally Accepted Accounting Principles, or GAAP, which state that revenues should not be counted until both parties have properly signed a contract. During the four quarters of fiscal 2000, for example, the practice improperly inflated revenues by 25%, 53%, 46% and 22%, respectively. The SEC said the goal was to meet or beat per-share earnings estimates of Wall Street analysts, a key to keeping a company's stock price rising.

The most extreme incident was the second quarter of 2000, when the company reported $557 million in revenues beyond the $1.047 billion it could properly claim. The company thus reported 60 cents in earnings per share, beating the consensus Wall Street forecast of 59 cents. Without the padded revenue, earnings would have been a mere 5 cents per share and the stock price might well have fallen.

In April 2004 Computer Associates International restated $2.2 billion in sales that had improperly during 1999 and 2000. The restatement did not change the company's overall past financial results or current sales and profits.

== Punishment ==
The United States Federal Sentencing Guidelines dictated a life sentence for Stephen Richards if found guilty; a spokesman for the U.S. Attorney's Office for the Eastern District of New York said that he "could have faced 100 years in prison."

On April 24, 2006 - two weeks before a scheduled trial, Stephen Richards pleaded guilty to eight felonies, including securities fraud, obstruction of justice and perjury.

Sentencing
Richards was subsequently sentenced to seven years in jail plus three years supervised release by U.S. District Court Judge I. Leo Glasser.

Incarceration
He was incarcerated at Taft Correctional Institution in Taft, California. Due to an error on the part of the Bureau of Prisons, Richards was initially placed in a minimum security prison – which would have been appropriate given the charges, except that he was not a US citizen – meaning he was not eligible for minimum security regardless of the crime. He was then placed in solitary confinement for 6 weeks whilst the paper work was processed, after which time he was released into general population with the low security prisoners.

Re-sentencing
In August 2010 a federal appeals court ordered that he be re-sentenced because the district judge failed to give Richards credit for accepting responsibility for his actions, and in October 2010 his lawyers successfully appealed his original convictions, with Judge Leo Glasser re-sentencing him to time served.

Release
He was released from Taft Correctional Institute in October 2010. He was immediately taken into custody by U.S. Immigration and Customs Enforcement Services and held for a month whilst they processed his deportation.

== Later life ==
Stephen Richards now resides in Queensland, Australia where he works with a technology company and speaks about his experiences.
