= Cache IQ =

Cache IQ, Inc.
- Type: Private
- Industry: Computer data storage
- Founded: Austin, Texas (2010)
- Headquarters: Austin, United States
- Website: cacheiq.com

Cache IQ, Inc. was an Austin, Texas, US-based network computing company which created an inline caching appliance for network-attached storage (NAS). Founded in 2010, the management team included former NetQoS CEO Joel Trammell. The company was reported to have received $5 million in initial funding from angel investors. According to InformationWeek, Cache IQ came out of stealth mode in September 2011.

NetApp acquired Cache IQ in November 2012.

== History ==
Cache IQ was formed in 2010 and built its product from intellectual property it purchased from the defunct Austin-based startup StorSpeed Inc. The company was co-founded by Austin software executive Joel Trammell, who had earlier founded NetQoS, a network performance management company acquired by CA Technologies in 2009 for $200 million.

In 2011, Cache IQ raised $6 million from 27 private investors. Trammell said the company had planned to raise venture capital but changed course when venture investors showed little interest in enterprise software deals. The company had 14 employees in 2011.

=== Acquisition by NetApp ===
On November 14, 2012, NetApp announced a definitive agreement to acquire Cache IQ, saying the deal would give it intellectual property to support nondisruptive operations in enterprise data center environments, to be integrated into NetApp's products over time. NetApp did not disclose financial terms at the time,

== See also ==
- List of companies based in Austin, Texas
