= Trammel =

Trammel or Trammels or Trammell may refer to:

== Devices ==
- Trammel, a kind of fishing net
- Trammel, a historical kind of shackle or hobble used to force a horse into a lateral ambling gait
- Trammel hook, a kind of adjustable pot hook hung in a chimney
- Elliptic trammel, a tool for drawing ellipses
- Trammel, a beam compass consisting of with metal points clamped to a beam

== Places ==
- Trammel, Virginia
- Trammels, Texas, United States

== People ==
- Allen Trammell (born 1942), American football player
- Joel Trammell (born 1965), American businessman
- Trammell, both a surname and a given name

== Other uses ==
- Trammel v. United States
