= Vegeta (disambiguation) =

Vegeta is a character in Dragon Ball media, son of King Vegeta and ancestor of Vegeta Jr.

Vegeta may also refer to:

- Vegeta (condiment), produced by the company Podravka
- Vegeta (software), HTTP load testing tool
- Ulmus × hollandica 'Vegeta' (Chichester Elm)
- Ulmus × hollandica 'Vegeta' (Huntingdon Elm)
