= CNSO =

CNSO may refer to:

- China News Service Online
- China National Symphony Orchestra
- Czech National Symphony Orchestra
- Consco, a defunct software company (NASDAQ ticker symbol: CNSO)
