= Wang Center =

Wang Center may refer to:

- Wang Center for the Performing Arts, former name of the Boch Center, in Boston, Massachusetts
- Charles B. Wang Center, a building on the campus of the State University of New York at Stony Brook
