= CA7 =

CA7 or CA-7 can mean:

- CA-7 (software), a workflow automation package
- Carbonic anhydrase 7, a human gene
- California's 7th congressional district
- California State Route 7
- United States Court of Appeals for the Seventh Circuit
