= Sanjay Kumar (business executive) =

Sri Lankan-American business executive

- Born: Sanjay Kumar; 1962 (age 63–64); Colombo, Sri Lanka
- Education: Furman University
- Occupations: CEO of CA Technologies (2000-2004); Former owner of New York Islanders (2000–16)

Sanjay Kumar (born 1962) is the former chairman and CEO of Computer Associates International (now CA Technologies), from 2000 until April 2004.

He was sentenced to 12 years in prison in connection with the 35 day month accounting scandal and released in 2017.

== Early childhood ==
He immigrated with his family to the United States in 1976 to escape civil unrest in his native Sri Lanka. The family originally settled in South Carolina. He attended Furman University from 1980 to 1983, and left without completing a degree.

== Career ==
Kumar became an employee of Computer Associates in 1987 when it acquired UCCEL Corp. in an $800 million buyout. Kumar was, at the time, UCCEL's director of software development and had been employed by UCCEL only for a few months.

Kumar was promoted to vice president of planning the following year, relocating to Computer Associates' Long Island headquarters. Over the years, he held various leadership roles at the firm. In 1989, he became senior vice president of planning and in 1993 moved up to Executive Vice President of Operations. Kumar was named president and chief operating officer in 1994 at age 31. Kumar succeeded the retiring Tony Wang, the older brother of Chief Executive Officer Charles Wang, as Tony was pressured to leave to make way.

In 2000, Kumar replaced his mentor Charles Wang as chief executive officer of the firm and in 2002 became chairman of Computer Associates' board of directors. Kumar is widely credited with moving CA to be more customer-friendly.

== Resignation ==
Kumar resigned as chairman and chief executive in April 2004, following an investigation into securities fraud and obstruction of justice at Computer Associates. He remained with the firm in the new position of chief software architect for about six weeks before leaving the firm altogether on June 4, 2004. A federal grand jury in Brooklyn indicted him on fraud charges on September 22, 2004. Kumar pleaded guilty to obstruction of justice and securities fraud charges on April 24, 2006. On November 2, 2006, it was reported that he was sentenced to 12 years in prison and fined $8 million for his role in a massive accounting fraud at Computer Associates.

== Sentencing ==
At the hearing in federal court in Brooklyn, Judge Leo Glasser sentenced Kumar, 44 years old, to 144 months in prison, to be followed by three years supervised release. The judge deferred payment of the fine until after restitution is determined at a hearing scheduled for February 2, 2007. Kumar was scheduled to report to prison on February 27, but that was delayed by two months due to delays in the restitution hearing. The start of the prison sentence was then delayed again, to November. However, in early June U.S. District Judge I. Leo Glasser ordered Kumar to surrender by August 14, 2007, to the federal correctional center in Fairton, New Jersey, to begin his 12-year sentence, and on that date he did so. Upon starting his prison sentence, Kumar alleged that Charles Wang, cofounder of Computer Associates, "personally directed" improper accounting there going back to 1987. Kumar said that board members Lewis Ranieri and Alfonse D'Amato, the former New York Republican senator, "had knowledge of" the accounting misdeeds for which he went to prison — going back "at least" to 2003.

"I stand before your honor today to take full responsibility for my actions," Kumar said prior to sentencing. "I know that I was wrong and there's no excuse for my conduct."

Kumar was released from federal prison on January 25, 2017.

== Restitution ==
On April 13, 2007, Judge Glasser approved an agreement for Kumar to pay $798.6 million in restitution, at least $52 million by December 31, 2008. After he served his 12-year prison term, the government may take 20% of his future gross annual pay for restitution.

== Other investments ==
At one time, Kumar was a part owner, with Wang, in the New York Islanders hockey team and New York Dragons arena football team, but, according to local news reports, Wang purchased Kumar's share in 2006.

Sporting positions
| Preceded by Steven Gluckstern; Howard Milstein | New York Islanders owner 2000–2016; Served alongside: Charles Wang | Succeeded by Jon Ledecky; Scott D. Malkin |
