= Runscope =

Software testing tool

- Company type: Private
- Industry: API testing, software testing
- Founded: 2013 (San Francisco, California)
- Founder: John Sheehan, Frank Stratton
- Headquarters: San Francisco, U.S.
- Area served: Worldwide
- Key people: John Sheehan (CEO), Frank Stratton (CTO)
- Products: Runscope

Runscope is a SaaS-based company that sells software for API performance testing, monitoring and debugging. Runscope is based in San Francisco, California.

== General ==
Runscope provides cloud-based and hybrid on-premises software that allows businesses to monitor, test, and debug web-service APIs. Runscope API tests can be used to test against services available in the public cloud, running on a private network behind a firewall, or running on a local development environment.

== Integrations ==
Runscope integrates with continuous integration and deployment platforms, such as Jenkins, Amazon CodePipeline, CircleCI, and TeamCity. Runscope’s API methods for executing tests and checking on test status allow it to be integrated with other CI/CD tools and platforms as well.

Runscope supports a variety of notification options for sending test completion and failure results. Runscope integrates with team communication platforms Slack, HipChat and Flowdock. Runscope also integrates with incident management systems AlertOps, PagerDuty, VictorOps, OpsGenie and StatusPage.io.

Runscope also integrates with third-party software analytics platforms, including New Relic Insights, Keen IO and Datadog.

== History ==
Runscope was founded in 2013 by John Sheehan and Frank Stratton.

Runscope has raised approximately $7.1 million in venture capital funding. Runscope received its first round of seed funding in May 2013 for the amount of $1.1 million from Andreessen Horowitz, True Ventures, Lerer Hippeau Ventures, Jon Dahl, Nat Friedman, David Cohen, and Ullas Naik. Runscope's Series A round of funding was led by General Catalyst Partners.

In September 2017, CA Technologies acquired Runscope. CA Technologies also owns BlazeMeter, a load-testing platform for software. In July 2019, two platforms were merged into one under Blazemeter brand.

In September 2021, Broadcom, which acquired CA Technologies in 2018, announced that it would sell BlazeMeter to Perforce. Perforce announced that it had completed the acquisition process on November 1, 2021.

== Acquisitions ==
In December 2014, Runscope acquired Ghost Inspector, a company that provides cloud-based UI and browser testing for websites and web applications.
