= Charles B. Wang Center =

Cultural center in Stony Brook, New York

Coordinates: 40.91590°N 73.11972°W

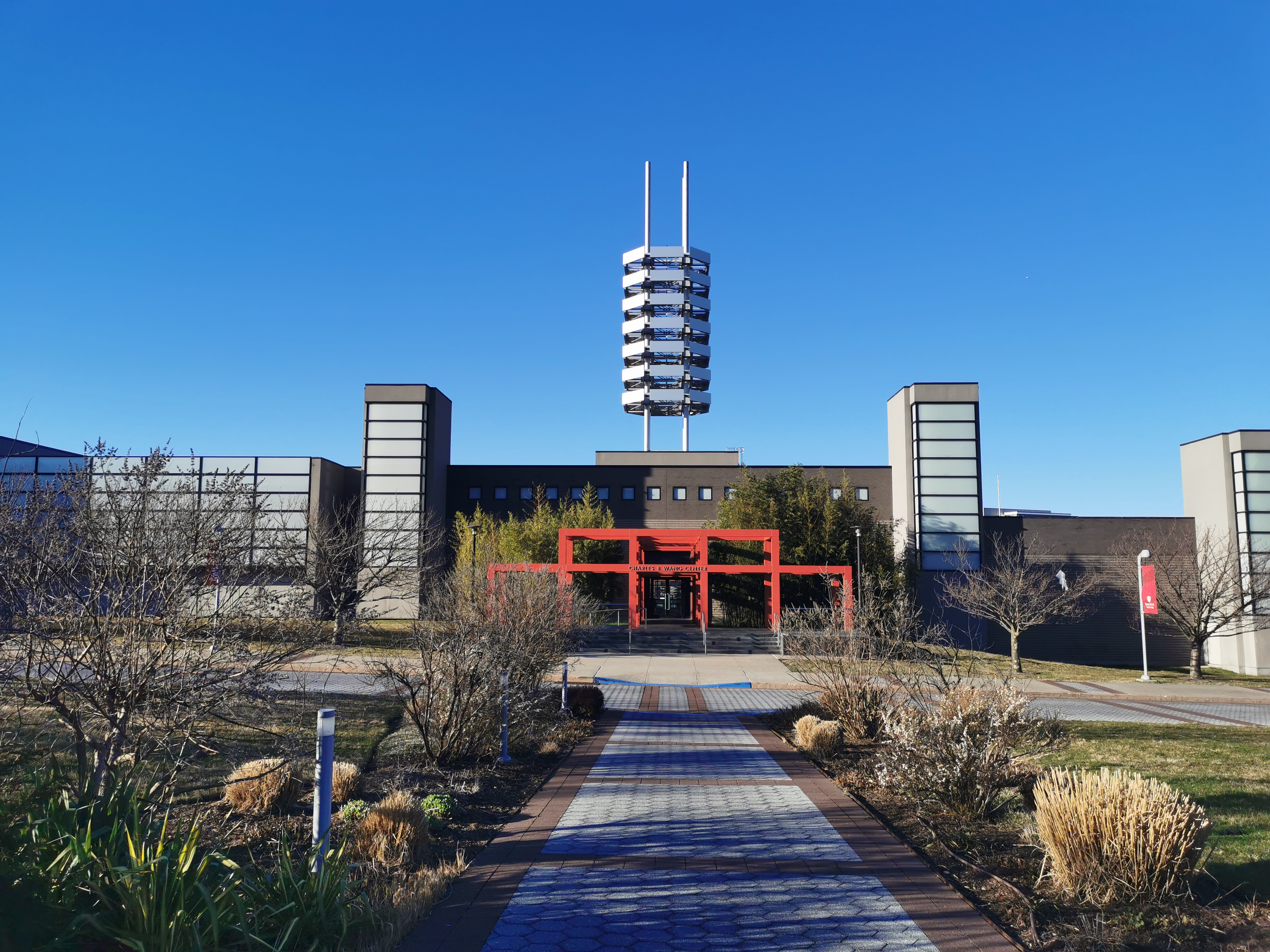
- The front entrance to the Wang Center
- Interactive map of the Charles B. Wang Center area

General information
- Type: Cultural center
- Architectural style: East Asian
- Location: 100 Nicolls Road; Stony Brook, NY 11790
- Construction started: 1996
- Opened: October 22, 2002
- Cost: $52 million (USD)
- Owner: Stony Brook University

Height
- Height: 80 ft

Technical details
- Floor area: 120,000 sq ft

Design and construction
- Architect: P.H. Tuan

Website
- https://www.stonybrook.edu/commcms/wang/index.php

The Charles B. Wang Center, located at Stony Brook University in Stony Brook, New York, in Suffolk County, on Long Island, is a building dedicated to understanding Asian and American cultures, and the interactions of these cultures with other world cultures. The center was completed in 2002, and was designed by P.H. Tuan. Building of the center was intended to be funded by Charles B. Wang through a $52 million donation to Stony Brook University, which was then the largest ever private donation to a school in the State University of New York system. Actual construction costs far exceeded the original donation, becoming a source of controversy among students and faculty at the time.

The building covers 120,000 square feet (11,000 m^{2}), and is noted for its interior architecture. The building holds numerous conference halls, classrooms (although no classes have been held in the building), auditoriums, a chapel, and an East Asian food court for students. Thus far, the center has been the location for numerous presentations, as well as films, and conferences that deal with multicultural issues.

== History ==
In 1996, Wang announced a donation of $25 million for the construction of an Asian American center on the campus of Stony Brook University. Wang, a graduate of Queens College, chose to donate to Stony Brook University because of its internationally renowned computer science program and its location near the Long Island headquarters of Computer Associates, Inc., his company. Wang was also close friends with Shirley Strum Kenny, Stony Brook's president at the time and the former Queens College president. The donation was the largest ever to a State University of New York campus, and Stony Brook University leased a four-acre plot to Wang for the construction of a 25,000-square-foot building.

The construction of the center was met with delays and ultimately fell three years behind schedule as the original plan of a 25,000-square-foot building increased to a 120,000-square-foot complex. The building became controversial for appearing to prioritize Asian cultures over others, Computer Associates' business practices, and Wang's close ties to Kenny. The center formally opened on Tuesday, October 22, 2002 with a ceremony from New York governor George Pataki.

== Architecture ==
The building was designed by architect P.H. Tuan of Oyster Bay, New York. The building is made of brick and white translucent glass panels designed to symbolize washi paper, which were used for windows in ancient Asian architecture. An 80-foot octagonal tower protruding from the center of the building's roof, which contains 20 roof lights and 56 layers of steel, was designed after an abstract pagoda. In the center's outdoor gardens, an arched bridge with steps is reminiscent of Shanghai temples.

On the first floor of the Wang Center is an East Asian food court named Jasmine, which includes dining options such as bibimbap, poke bowls and other Chinese, Japanese and Korean foods. In 2019, a 550-square foot Pan-Asian mini grocery store, the Jasmine Market, opened, selling international grocery items, snacks, and beverages.

== Mission ==
The Charles B. Wang Center initiates and collaborates with academic departments, student groups, community organizations, and individuals in presenting the public with a multifaceted, intellectually sound, and humane understanding of East Asian cultures, and their relationship to other cultures.

The Wang Center is also a presenting venue for events of cultural, professional and intellectual calibre that are initiated by and involve the various components of Stony Brook University, Long Island communities and organizations, as well as other regional, national, and international constituencies. The Wang Center is non-partisan and non-sectarian, and upholds the values of pluralism, democracy, and equality.

== Bridge across cultures ==
The Charles B. Wang Center building is adorned with a 100-foot octagonal pagoda, a structure traditionally associated with Chinese temples.

Architect PH Tuan has captured Wang's ideals in a building resonant with the traditions of East Asian design. Spare gray walls, pierced with three red trellis entrances, invite the visitor to explore the treasures of the interior. Within, Tuan has unified the elements of interior space, the outdoors, and the enclosing sky, using wide expanses of glass to frame traditional East Asian gardens, pools, and bridges. The Center has the capability to link scholars and researchers from all over the world in real time, and it welcomes many cultural and artistic activities, especially those that reflect the cultures of East Asia. Scholars, students, international business people, and East Asian-American communities use the facility to build bridges of understanding, exchange information, and celebrate their cultural identities.

The main ceremonial entrance leads across an ornamental pool into a spacious reception area. The three-story space is filled with natural light and the sound of fountains that flow from 12 Chinese Zodiac sculptures into the south pool. To the north of the lobby is an expansive outdoor garden, while more intimate interior galleries lie west and south. These are designed as a showcase for cultural displays and art exhibitions of varying sizes. A 239-seat theater hosts audiences for the performing arts and other events. Well equipped with conference facilities, the Center holds two mid-sized lecture halls that are wired for laptops and the most current audiovisual presentations.
