= CA-7 (software) =

CA-7 is a job scheduling / workflow automation software package sold by CA Technologies (formerly CA, Inc. and Computer Associates International, Inc.). It is commonly used by banks and other large enterprises with IBM mainframe IT computing platforms. In 1987, Computer Associates took ownership of the product when it acquired its archrival, UCCEL Corporation. CA subsequently renamed it from UCC-7 to CA-7, as was done with product prefixes for UCC-1 (tape library management) and UCC-11 (batch job rerun/restart), etc.
