= Tape management system =

A tape management system (TMS) is computer software that manages the usage and retention of computer backup tapes. This may be done as a stand-alone function or as part of a broader backup software package.

== The role of a tape management system ==
A modern tape management system (TMS) is usually used in conjunction with backup applications and are generally used to manage magnetic tape media that contains backup information and other electronically stored information. Tape management systems are used by organizations to locate, track, and rotate media according to an organizations internal policies as well as government regulations.

== Categories of tape management systems ==
=== Stand-alone tape management systems ===
Stand-alone tape management systems are predominant on mainframe platforms where tape is used as both a backup and base load storage medium.

Mainframe systems such as IBM's z/OS do provide some basic support for tape inventory control via the OS Catalog but as cataloging files is optional it is usually required that an additional software package does the following:

- Ensure that live tape volumes are not over-written.
- Keep a list of tape volumes that are eligible to be over-written (known as scratch tapes).
- Maintain an online catalog of the location of files written to tape and a list of what files reside on each tape volume.

These operations are usually achieved by using operating system "hooks" to intercept file open and close operations.

== Commercially available tape management systems ==
=== Mainframe ===
==== Stand-alone tape management systems ====
- BrightStore CA-1 (previously known as UCC-1, until Computer Associates acquired Uccel in 1987)
- CA Dynam/TLMS (previously known as TLMS II, until Computer Associates acquired Capex Corporation in 1982)
- Valu-Lib, from Value Computing, Inc.
- IBM RMM
- BMC Control-M/Tape (previously known as Control-T, until BMC Software acquired New Dimension Software in 1999)
- ASG Zara
- Lascon Storage's GFS/AFM

==== Robotic control/management systems ====
- StorageTek HSC
- StorageTek ExLM

=== Distributed systems ===
- AES Webscan Tape Management System
- TapeTrack Tape Management Framework
- Vertices Tape Management System
- VaultLedger Tape Management System

== See also ==
- Tape library
- List of backup software
