= Trammell =

Trammell is both a surname and a given name. Notable people with the name include:

== Given name ==
- Trammell Crow (1914–2009), American property developer

== Surname ==
- Alan Trammell (born 1958), American baseball shortstop
- Austin Trammell (born 1998), American football player
- Bobby Lee Trammell (1934–2008), American rockabilly singer and politician
- Bubba Trammell (born 1971), American baseball outfielder
- Charles M. Trammell (1886–1967), judge of the United States Board of Tax Appeals
- Dennis Trammell (born 1982), American basketball player
- Jeffrey Trammell (born 1950), American lobbyist and political consultant
- Joel Trammell, (born 1965) American businessman
- Lloyd Trammell (born 1953), American inventor
- Pamela Veuleman Trammell, American historian and clubwoman
- Park Trammell (1876–1936), American politician from Florida
- Pat Trammell (1940–1968), All-American quarterback
- Robert Trammell (Florida politician) (born 1945), American politician from Florida
- Sam Trammell (born 1969), American actor
- Taylor Trammell (born 1997), American baseball outfielder
- Terrence Trammell (born 1978), African American track and field athlete
