= 35-day month =

Element of a 2002 accounting scandal

The "35 day month" was the basis of "$2.2 billion in accounting fraud" regarding "events regarding an accounting scandal that started in 2002" at Computer Associates.

The company's "books were routinely kept open until revenues exceeded projected goals." Specifics were described as "a scheme to inflate sales and profits by pretending lucrative contracts were signed earlier than, in fact, they had been. To support this violation of law, faxes of contracts were "cleaned up ... by removing time stamps .."

The most immediate impact was that it "cost investors hundreds of millions of dollars," although unlike the matters of Worldcom and Enron, to which it was compared, "Computer Associates - since renamed CA Inc - did not go bankrupt." An overview by the Wharton School of the University of Pennsylvania wrote that corporate directors, upon seeing signs of "35-day month ... 'the three-day window ... (and) flash period" "should be especially vigilant."

== Named CA personnel ==
- Former CEO Sanjay Kumar, who served time and paid penalties
- Former sales executive Stephen Richards
- Former CA general counsel Steven Woghin, sentenced to two years.

Reporting at the time added "other former executives have been indicted or fired;" "several... have pleaded guilty to criminal charges."
