= CA IT Process Automation Manager =

Process automation tool

CA Process Automation, also known as "PAM", is a process automation tool from CA Technologies, commonly used to automate and orchestrate IT processes. Upon the release of version 3.0 in 2011, CA Technologies changed the name from CA IT Process Automation Manager to CA Process Automation.

== Acquisition ==
It was acquired by CA when they purchased Washington DC–based Optinuity where it was known as Oasis.

== Differences from other RBA tools ==
Unlike other process automation tools, PAM has a fully functional client (known as a Touchpoint). While Microsoft Opalis also has an agent, its Unix agent is not as functional as its Windows agents. The other main vendor tools only use their integrations with other tools to implement the defined processes.

The custom operators (objects that make up processes) can be two types; calculations which are executed within the orchestrator engine, these can be written in JavaScript. The other type is a TouchPoint script which can also include an inline script containing process level variables. This allows ITPAM to act as a central repository for scripts to be executed on remote systems. These scripts can be written in any scripting language.

The first change that CA made to the tool was to include eTrust embedded entitlements manager (EEM). A fully functional entitlement engine for the resources defined to PAM allowing specific allocation of access to groups and users.

== Components ==
PAM has an open architecture based on Java Virtual Machines.

=== Orchestrator ===
The server component is a Java Application that reads from the Process Library and executes the processes. The Orchestrators can be scaled horizontally by adding more Orchestrators to handle the workload.

=== Process Library ===
The Process Library is the database containing the defined processes and operators. It supports databases including Oracle, MS-SQL or MySQL.

=== Process designer ===
The GUI is a Web application used to define processes and create custom operators graphically using drag and drop.

=== Operations console ===
A dashboard containing the status of the processes along with a visual representation.
