= Nimsoft =

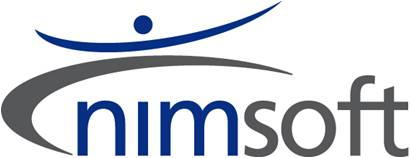
- Type: Brand
- Industry: IT Management software
- Founded: 1998
- Headquarters: Long Island, New York, United States
- Parent: CA Technologies
- Website: www.nimsoft.com

Nimsoft was an independent company software vendor that offered information technology (IT) monitoring, service desk products, and services. It was acquired by CA Inc. in 2010, and since October 2012 its products were integrated into that business. The Nimsoft brand is still used by CA.

Nimsoft products allow users to monitor and manage business services and specific systems within the IT infrastructure, including network components, servers, databases, applications, virtualized environments and Artificial Intelligence (AI) technology.

Nimsoft software also allows customers to monitor systems hosted in internal data centers, as well as in externally hosted environments, including software as a service (SaaS) and cloud computing environments.

== History ==
Nimbus Software was founded in Oslo, Norway, in 1998 (not to be confused with Nimbus Data). Converse Software, the exclusive US distributor of Nimbus Software, was founded in Silicon Valley in 2002. Nimbus Software and Converse Software merged in 2004 to form Nimsoft. Gary Read, the founder of the US distributor, was appointed CEO and the new company's headquarters were established in Silicon Valley. In 2007 a 10.3 million Series A round of funding from JMI Equity and Northzone Ventures closed. Nimsoft acquired Indicative Software in April 2008 to offer business service management and established a new research and development base in Fort Collins, Colorado. Nimsoft received the San Francisco Business Times 2008 "Best Place to Work Award". Nimsoft closed a $12 million funding round led by Goldman Sachs in October 2008.

In May 2009 Nimsoft acquired the intellectual property assets of Cittio. It allowed users access to product capabilities including network discovery, topology mapping, and root cause analysis (RCA) utilizing graph theory. That October Nimsoft announced its unified monitoring architecture to monitor externally hosted systems and services, including SaaS and cloud computing-based IT infrastructures.

In March 2010, CA Inc. announced it would acquire Nimsoft for $350 million. In September 2010, Nimsoft extended its software to allow support of Vblock products from the VCE Company.

In April 2011, Nimsoft announced its Unified Manager, software combining IT monitoring and service management. Enhanced management support for NetApp storage was announced in June. CA acquired Netherlands-based WatchMouse in July, and its software was integrated into Nimsoft.

Nimsoft ceased to exist as an independent operating unit within CA in 2012, although the same products are still offered under that brand name.

Since CA Inc. was acquired by Broadcom in 2018, the product has been re-branded as DX Unified Infrastructure Management.
