= Consco =

US software development firm

Consco Enterprises Inc.
- Type: Public
- Traded as: Nasdaq: CNSO
- Products: Software

Consco Enterprises Inc. was a software development firm headquartered in Edison, New Jersey, United States, active from 1972 to 1988.

== Products ==
Consco's primary product dubbed Consolidation, was based on pegboard accounting principles and designed to generate complex quarterly and annual tax reports for large multi-national corporations. Pegboard systems were and are still sold nationwide by "Control o fax" in Waterloo, Iowa.

The main Consolidation product was later packaged with other Consco financial applications, such as Currency Conversion, which added functionality. The package was named Accounting Information System, or AIS.

== Clients ==
Some AIS clients included the Ford Motor Company, Campbell's, Miles Laboratories, LTV Corporation, Owens-Illinois, Texaco, Pennzoil, The Tennessee Valley Authority and Cummins Engine Company.

Consco's shares were traded on NASDAQ under the symbol CNSO. An unrelated company, CNS Response, now uses that symbol. In 1988, the company sold its product line to Computer Associates. In May 1984, Seymour Altucher was the company's chairman.

== See also ==
- Atria Software
