= Charles Wang =

Chinese-American computer company businessman and billionaire (1944–2018)

- 王嘉廉
- Wang in 2016
- Born: August 19, 1944; Shanghai, China
- Died: October 21, 2018 (aged 74); Cove Neck, New York, U.S.
- Occupations: Owner, New York Islanders; Investor
- Known for: Co-founder, CA Technologies
- Spouse(s): Ingrid S. Wang (div); Nancy Li
- Children: 3

Chinese name
- Chinese: 王嘉廉
Transcriptions
Standard Mandarin
- Hanyu Pinyin: Wáng Jiālián [wǎŋ tɕjáljɛ̌n]
- Wade–Giles: Wáng Chiā-Lién

Charles B. Wang (Chinese: 王嘉廉; pinyin: Wáng Jiālián; August 19, 1944 – October 21, 2018) was a Chinese-American billionaire, businessman, and philanthropist, who was a co-founder and CEO of Computer Associates International, Inc. (later renamed CA Technologies). He was a minority owner (and past majority owner) of the NHL's New York Islanders ice hockey team and their AHL affiliate, as well as the owner of the New York Dragons of the Arena Football League.

In 1976, at age 31, Wang (pronounced "Wong") launched Computer Associates, using credit cards for funding. Wang then grew Computer Associates into one of the country's largest ISVs (independent software vendors). Wang authored two books to help executives master technology: Techno Vision (1994, McGraw-Hill) and Techno Vision II (1997, McGraw-Hill). Wang retired from Computer Associates in 2002. He was an active philanthropist, working with such organizations as Smile Train, the World Childhood Foundation, the Islanders Children's Foundation and the National Center for Missing and Exploited Children, among others. In January 2022, the new UBS Arena in Belmont, home of the New York Islanders, raised a plaque to honor Wang for all his work and dedication to the team. Wang's net worth was estimated to be $17.6 billion.

== Early life ==
Charles B. Wang was born in Shanghai to parents Kenneth and Mary Wang. He has two brothers, Anthony W. Wang and Francis Wang. His father was a Supreme Court judge in the Republic of China. In the closing years of the Chinese Civil War which saw the Nationalist government flee to Taiwan, the Wangs moved to Queens, New York City when he was eight years old. He attended Brooklyn Technical High School in Fort Greene, Brooklyn. Wang earned a Bachelor of Science degree from Queens College and began his computer career at Columbia University's Riverside Research Institute.

== Business ==
=== Computer Associates ===
Wang and his business partner Russell Artzt established Computer Associates in 1976. By 1989, Computer Associates became the second software-only company to reach US$1 billion in revenues.

Wang's tenure as CEO of Computer Associates was marked by rapid growth, frequently as a result of strict hiring practices and high expectations for executives of acquired companies. Nearly all of Computer Associates' managers were promoted from within, so very few acquired managers were kept. Newly hired salespeople had some sales experience, but specifically not in software. A Master's Degree in Business Administration held little to no value at CA, so employment candidates and acquired employees with MBAs were typically rejected. It was unusual for a technician to be considered for sales because the firm's training program was geared toward products instead of professional selling. The pass/fail demarcation was sharp, so perceived inadequate sales performance meant termination. All told, Wang engaged in several dozen acquisitions and those acquired facilities were repopulated with Computer Associates employees.

He was also known for his commitment to a family-oriented management style, and for promoting several women to management positions. In 1979, three years after the company's founding, Wang had installed his older brother Tony, a one-time corporate lawyer, as president and COO. Tony held the position until his retirement in 1992 to make way for Sanjay Kumar, who joined the company via its 1987 surprising acquisition of archrival Uccel Corporation. In 1998, Nancy Li, Charles Wang's second wife, was named the company's Chief Technology Officer ("CTO"). Responding to criticism over his so-called "paternalistic" management style, Wang had argued that the investment community punished Computer Associate's stock price because of his refusal to override his sense of familial loyalty to avoid the appearance of nepotism.

In 1998, Wang had initiated a $9 billion hostile takeover for the shares of Computer Sciences Corporation (CSC). The Washington Post reported CSC management's "concern" about the tender offer by alluding to Computer Associates' "ties to foreigners." It was a pointed reference to Wang's origin and that certain Chinese government institutions (as well as those in North America, Europe and elsewhere) were Computer Associates clients. The suggestion was that becoming linked with Computer Associates would jeopardize CSC's contracts with U.S. government agencies. Blaming what in his view was a witch-hunt with racial motivations, Wang dropped the tender offer.

In 2000, a class-action lawsuit accused Wang, then president Kumar and co-founder Artzt of wrongly reporting more than $2.5 billion in revenue in its 1997, 1998, 1999 and 2000 fiscal (April through March) years in order to artificially inflate the stock price. A previous stock option set in 1995 specified that a certain number of shares would vest when Computer Associates' shares sustained a target price. The benchmark was met in 1998, and the three executives combined received nearly $1 billion in Computer Associates stock with Wang himself netting $700 million; he had already been the highest paid CEO in the U.S. for the prior four years. Since then, at least four other class-action suits were filed against Computer Associates, all of which had named Wang specifically, and all of which were settled or dismissed without finding any liability on Wang's part. As the controversy continued to dog Wang even after he returned a portion of the stock award, he quit as CEO in 2000 and later resigned as chairman of the board in 2002.

Kumar resigned as chairman and chief executive in April 2004, following an investigation into the accounting scandal which improperly reported revenue. A federal grand jury in Brooklyn indicted Kumar on fraud charges on September 22, 2004. Kumar pleaded guilty to obstruction of justice and securities fraud charges on April 24, 2006.

=== New York Islanders ===
Wang was a minority owner of the New York Islanders of the National Hockey League (NHL) franchise, of which he had become a part-owner in 2000, and majority owner from 2001 to 2016. He later purchased the share of business partner Sanjay Kumar in 2004, and acquired the original Iowa Barnstormers Arena Football League franchise, moving them to Long Island and renaming them the New York Dragons. Wang's sometimes unorthodox decisions as owner received a mixture of praise and criticism.

According to former Islanders general manager Mike Milbury, Wang "assumed that nobody could put a goal past a sumo wrestler". Milbury said that "He was a man of his word, a guy who desperately wanted to keep the team on the Island."

Wang initially had a willingness to spend money with the goal of making the Islanders competitive; however, recent team payrolls decreased as the Islanders failed to reach the playoffs between the 2006–07 and 2012–13 seasons.

Wang hired Neil Smith as the Islanders' general manager during the 2006 Stanley Cup Finals, but 40 days later Smith was fired due to his unwillingness to adhere to the "management by committee" style of Wang. Wang then gave the job to Garth Snow, who subsequently retired from his playing position as the team's backup goaltender. Wang said that "philosophical differences" were the basis for firing Smith. This series of personnel moves, combined with Wang's approval of long-term contracts for Alexei Yashin and goaltender Rick DiPietro several years later, inspired a critical reaction from hockey journalists. Milbury reported that he had to talk Wang out of giving Michael Peca a ten-year deal.

A Forbes article investigated why certain NHL franchises could remain profitable despite poor attendance and overall league unprofitability. They found that several league owners under-reported their cable broadcast revenue; they specifically accused Wang of excluding half of the $17 million paid to the Islanders for the 2003 cable broadcast season. Wang made numerous efforts to build a new arena in Nassau County, as the Veterans Memorial Coliseum was the second-oldest active arena, and the Islanders lease ended in 2015.

He was the master developer of The Lighthouse Project, a property transformation of the Nassau Coliseum and surrounding 150 acres (0.61 km^{2}). The project was to have included a five-star hotel; condominiums; an athletic complex featuring four ice rinks, a basketball facility, and a state-of-the-art health club that would have served as the Islanders' practice facility and would have also been open to the public. The development would also have included a sports technology center, open-air plaza, and conference center. The project was deemed to be too large by Town of Hempstead Supervisor Kate Murray, who made a counter-proposal that was about half the size of what Wang had originally intended. Wang balked at Murray's proposal, and decided to try to finance the building of a new arena for the Islanders with public funds, rather than paying for it himself as part of the Lighthouse Project. In May 2011, Wang, along with Nassau County, started an 82-day campaign for a $400 million bond to fund a new arena for the Islanders. On August 1, 2011, the proposal was defeated by a margin of 57% to 43%.

Wang had stated that he would not have bought the team if he knew how difficult it would be, and would not do so if he had the choice over again. A New York Times article detailed Wang's "desperate" attempts to keep the team on Long Island. Ultimately, however, Wang was unable to secure a renovated or new arena in Uniondale. Jeff Wilpon, the COO of Major League Baseball's New York Mets, discussed the possibility of buying the Islanders from Wang and moving them adjacent to the Mets' home ballpark, Citi Field in Flushing, Queens. There were also reports that businessman Nelson Peltz wanted to buy the Islanders from Wang and move them to the Barclays Center in Brooklyn. On October 24, 2012, Wang announced that the Islanders would move to the Barclays Center in 2015, after the end of their lease at the Nassau Veterans Memorial Coliseum. In various interviews, Wang said that "it was Brooklyn, or out of town". Despite the move, the franchise retained the New York Islanders name as they were geographically still on Long Island, and after a short second tenure at the Coliseum moved to the new UBS Arena in Elmont, New York in 2021.

In August 2014, the NHL announced that Wang had agreed to sell "a substantial minority interest in the team" to a group of investors, including Jon Ledecky and Scott D. Malkin.

== Philanthropy ==
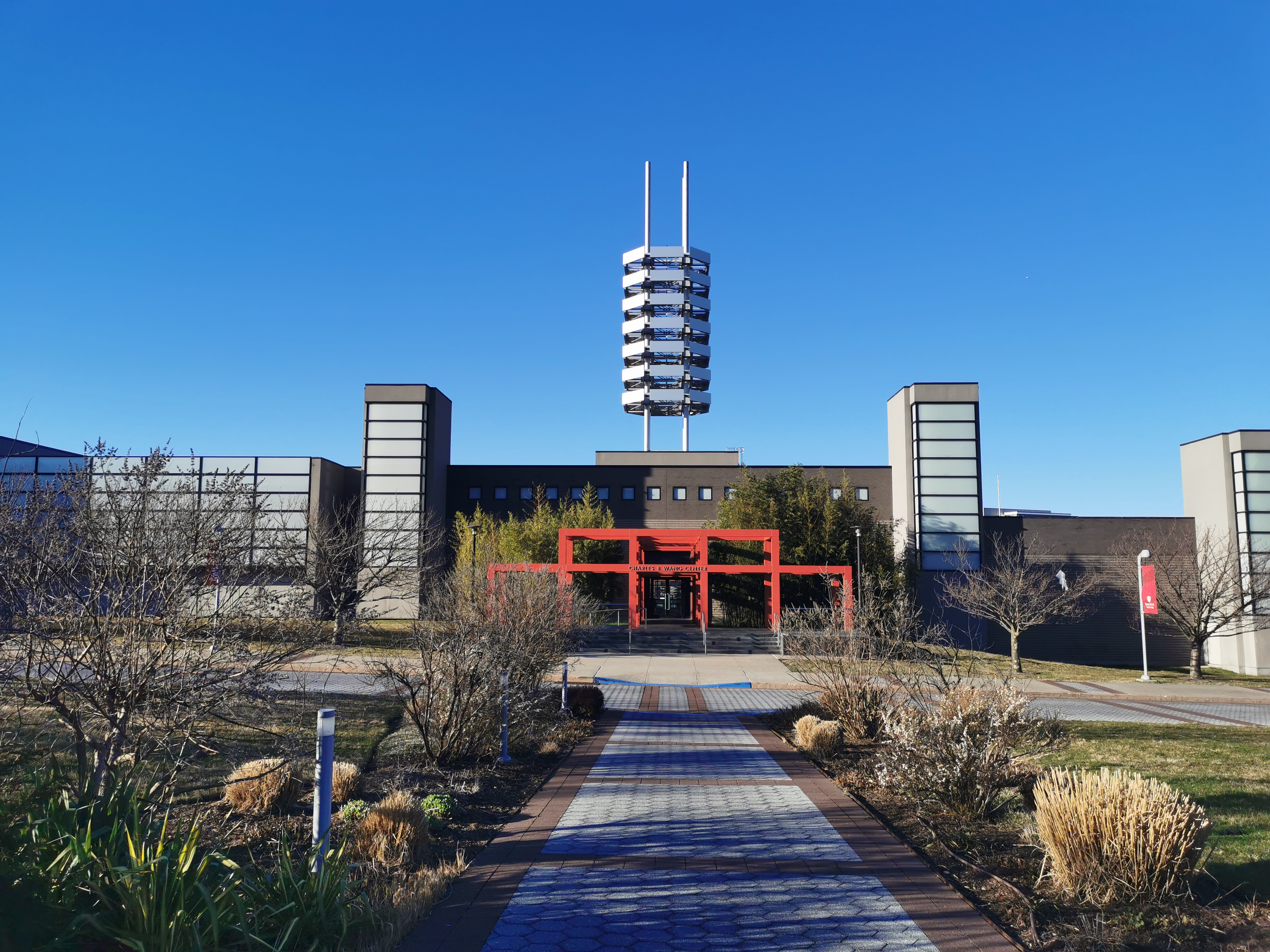
The Charles B. Wang Center

Wang was an active philanthropist and in 1999 established the Charles B. Wang Foundation with the goal of donating to numerous charities that focused on bettering the lives of children and the disenfranchised. He worked with such causes as Smile Train, the World Childhood Foundation, the Plainview Chinese Cultural Center and the National Center for Missing and Exploited Children, among others. His donation of over $50 million to Stony Brook University for the construction of the Charles B. Wang Center was, at the time, the largest in history to a State University of New York school. He also funded the expansion of the Chinatown Health Clinic which was renamed the Charles B. Wang Community Health Center.

As the co-founder and chairman of Smile Train in 1999, Wang gave a $30 million initial gift to cover all administrative expenses and henceforth remained active in the charity's efforts to help children with cleft lip and palates, in more than 80 countries.

One of the more important attributes that Wang brought to his ownership of the Islanders was to expand their community-based programs through the Islanders Children's Foundation, which started in 2003 and has become a mainstay. The foundation works with children's health, education, and youth hockey development charities. In 2006, the team created Project Hope, which is focused on developing ice hockey in China. Wang recruited women's professional hockey player, Angela Ruggiero, to the project as well.

In 2000, Wang and his brothers, Anthony and Francis, donated a new law school to China's Soochow University in honor of their father Kenneth Wang and in celebration of the university's 100th anniversary; it opened officially in 2003.

== Awards and honors ==
On May 3, 2009, Wang was honored by the Los Angeles Chinese Historical Society of Southern California in "Celebrating Chinese Americans in Sports".

== Personal life and death ==
Wang's Cove Neck mansion on the Gold Coast of Long Island is located near Sagamore Hill, President Theodore Roosevelt's home.

Wang died of lung cancer at his home in Cove Neck on October 21, 2018, at the age of 74.

Wang was survived by his mother; two brothers, Anthony and Francis; his wife, Nancy Li; and three children – Kimberly Dey, with his first wife, Ingrid S. Wang, and Jasmine and Cameron, with Ms. Li. He was also survived by three grandchildren.

== See also ==
- Chinese people in New York City
- Taiwanese people in New York City
- List of Queens College people
