= Arcserve =

Data management company

Arcserve, LLC

- Screenshot of Arcserve UDP Console
- Original author: arcserve
- Release: February 1990; 36 years ago
- Stable release: Arcserve Unified Data Protection 8.1 / August 23, 2021; 5 years ago
- Operating system: Windows, Linux, Unix, Mac
- Available in: 10 languages
- List of languages English, Chinese (Simplified), Chinese (Traditional), French, German, Italian, Japanese, Korean, Portuguese, Spanish
- Type: Data Protection
- License: Commercial proprietary software
- Website: arcserve.com

Logo of Cheyenne Software

Arcserve, LLC, is a provider of data protection, replication and recovery solutions for enterprise and mid-market businesses. Arcserve was founded in 1983 as Cheyenne Software. Software vendor CA Technologies, which was then known as Computer Associates, acquired Cheyenne in 1996 and continued to develop and market the Arcserve product under the same brand.

== History ==
Arcserve was first developed as a product used to back up other software programs and to ensure that data in the network could not be lost. The major function of the first release was to automatically copy all of the information in the system so that mishaps such as power failures and equipment malfunctions would not destroy or erase it. During the early nineties, Arcserve became Cheyenne's flagship product with massive growth in sales. Cheyenne brought out an improved version of its core program Arcserve in 1993 and began distribution through Original Equipment Manufacturers (OEMs).

During the mid-nineties, Cheyenne continued to release a series of new Arcserve products tailored specifically for different market segments such as Macintosh and Windows users. Software vendor CA Technologies, which was then known as Computer Associates, acquired Cheyenne in 1996 and continued to develop and market the Arcserve product under the same brand.

In August 2014, Arcserve became an independent company when Marlin Equity Partners acquired the business from CA Technologies. They released their first product and named it Arcserve Unified Data Protection (UDP). Arcserve provides some of the largest independent software vendor (ISV) developed backup software products in the market, and supports a wide variety of platforms and applications. Arcserve Unified Data Protection (UDP) is offered as fully integrated software, set-and-forget virtual or physical appliances, and the Arcserve(r) Cloud.

On April 26, 2017, Arcserve announced the acquisition of email archiving technology, now named Arcserve UDP Archiving. On July 11, 2017, Arcserve announced the acquisition of Zetta, a cloud-based disaster recovery solutions provider, by which it now offers direct-to-cloud DRaaS and BaaS with Arcserve UDP Cloud Direct.

On March 17, 2021, Arcserve announce that regulatory approval was received for the completion of the merger with StorageCraft.

== See also ==
- List of backup software
