= Joel Trammell =

American businessman and entrepreneur (born 1965)

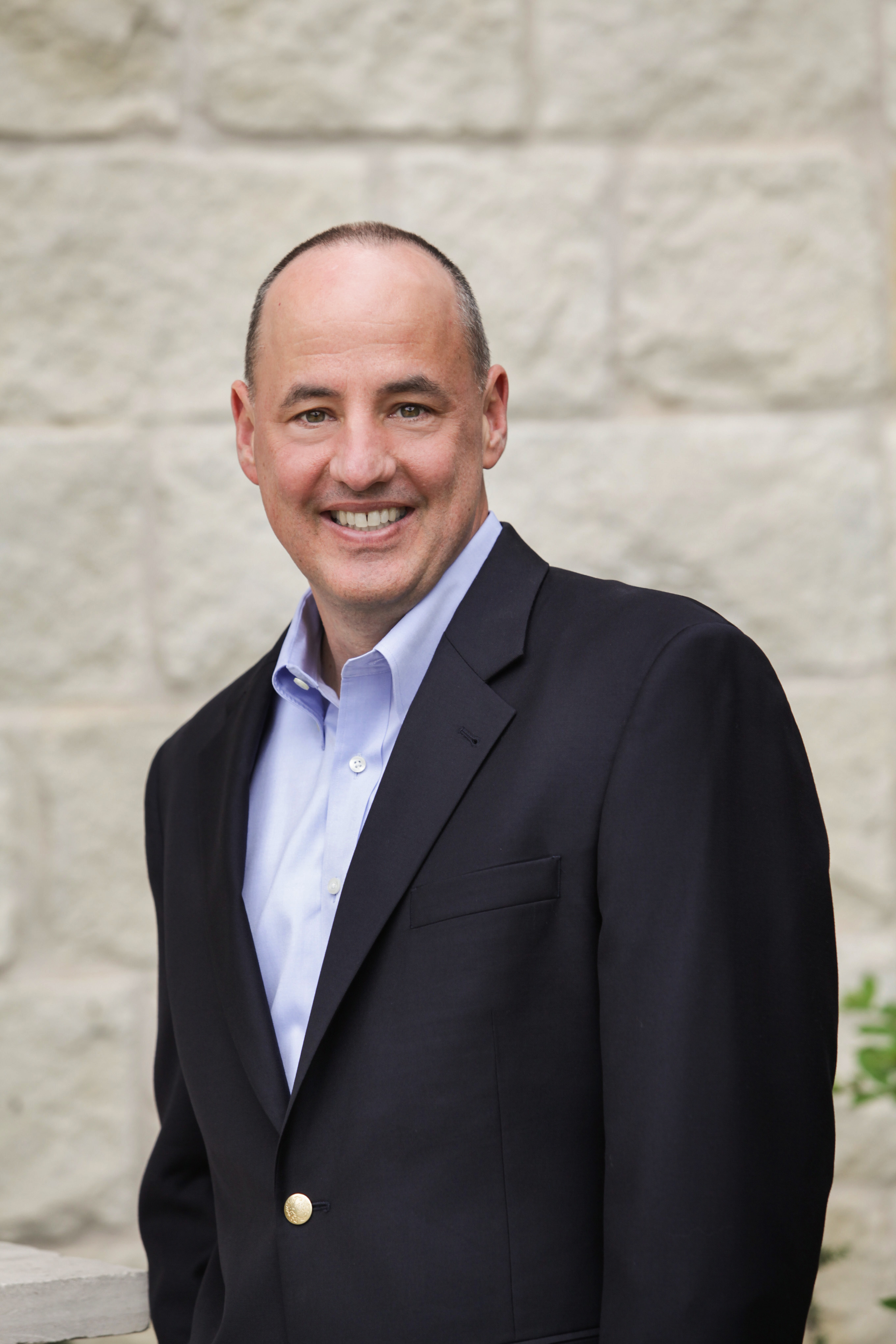
- Trammell in 2014
- Born: April 6, 1965 (age 61); Louisiana
- Occupations: Entrepreneur and CEO
- Known for: Network Management, CEO Education

Joel Trammell is an American businessman and entrepreneur.

Trammell is the former CEO of Black Box Network Services, and the founder and chairman of Khorus Software, which equips CEOs with strategy-execution software. He is also the author of The CEO Tightrope, published by Greenleaf Book Group in 2014. He has authored two additional books, The Manager’s Playbook (2021) and The Chief Executive Operating System (2023).

== Education ==
Trammell received his bachelor of science degree in electrical engineering from Louisiana Tech University in 1987. Trammell served on the board of directors for The Louisiana Tech University Research Foundation for the 2013–2014 year.

== Career ==
After college, Trammell went on to be an instructor at the Naval Nuclear Power School for four years. From 1990 to 1995, Trammell served as CEO for UST Computers, then co-founded HomeSmart. In 1999, Trammell and his wife, Cathy Fulton, co-founded NetQoS, a developer of network and application performance management software. He served as CEO until the company was acquired by CA Technologies in 2009 for $200 million. After NetQoS, Trammell founded Cache IQ, a developer of network resident caching solutions for file-based storage. Cache IQ was acquired by NetApp Inc. in November 2012. Trammell founded Khorus Software in 2013, a business management software company made specifically for CEOs to align organizations, execute strategy, and deliver predictable results. The company officially launched in February 2014 and Trammell serves as chairman.

Trammell served as a board member for Rise School of Austin and Austin Technology Council, where he serves as Chairman Emeritus. He is also a managing partner at Lake Austin Advisors. He served as a board member at Black Box Network Services until November 2017, when he was selected as CEO.

Trammell contributes to Forbes and Entrepreneur with advice for current and aspiring CEOs, as well as sharing his leadership experiences on his blog, The American CEO.

== Personal life ==
Joel Trammell is married to Cathy Fulton, with whom he co-founded NetQoS in 1999. They have three children and reside in Austin, Texas. Joel and Cathy are investors at BridgingApps, an Easter Seals Houston program which provides disabled children with communication and educational technology and training. Trammell enjoys playing tennis, and applies the lessons learned from the game to his entrepreneurship. In 1999, he won the "Player of the Year" award, for his sportsmanship and playing level from the Capital Area Tennis Association. In 2005, Joel and his tennis partner, Jonas Lundblad, won the USTA Men's 30 and Over National Doubles Championship, and again in 2014, with partner David Corrie. Trammell also enjoys playing poker and is a basketball fan.

== Awards and recognition ==
In 2006, Trammell was awarded Ernst and Young's "Entrepreneur of the Year" for its Central Texas Region and Austin Business Journal's "Private Company Executive of the Year" award. That year he also won the CEO Poker Tournament, taking home $15,870.
