= Oblicore =

Oblicore Inc.
- Industry: Software
- Founded: 2000; 26 years ago
- Founder: Erez Hendelman; Oren Gampel
- Fate: Acquired by CA, Inc.
- Headquarters: Boston, Tel Aviv
- Products: Service level management Solutions
- Services: ITIL solutions
- Website: www.Oblicore.com

Oblicore, Inc. is a US-based provider of service level management software built around the ITIL v3 framework. The company was founded in 2000 to address the burgeoning Service Level Management and Business Services Markets. Oblicore Guarantee (TM), their flagship product provides Service Catalog Management, Service Level Management, and Financial Management for service providers, enterprises, and IT Vendor Managers. They also offer Incident Impact Management for Service Desks. The company's research and development office is located in Tel Aviv, Israel.

In 2007, Oblicore was ranked 13 among Inc. 500's top Companies in Software.

In 2009, Oblicore Guarantee was listed as a Service Level Management Market Leader in an OVUM Butler Group Technology Audit.

The company has over one hundred customers, including AT&T, ABN Amro, Cable & Wireless, Chrysler, E.ON, France Télécom, ING, Lufthansa Systems, Siemens Medical Solutions, and T-Systems.

In January 2010, Oblicore was acquired by CA, Inc. for an undisclosed sum, although Israeli business news outlet Globes has reported that the purchase price was $25 million.
