= Russell Artzt =

American businessesman and software developer (born 1947)

Russell M. Artzt
- Born: January 23, 1947 (age 79); United States
- Education: Columbia University (attended)
- Occupations: Businessman, software developer
- Years active: 1970s–present
- Known for: Co-founding CA Technologies
- Notable work: Development of CA’s enterprise software products
- Title: Executive Chairman, RingLead

Russell M. Artzt (born January 23, 1947) is an American businessesman and software developer. He co-founded Computer Associates (now CA Technologies) with Charles B. Wang.

== Career ==
He met Wang in the 1960s while he was working at the Electronic Laboratories at Columbia University. They became friends and later both joined Standard Data Corporation, before founding CA in 1976. Artzt served as Vice Chairman and as President in charge of eTrust.

In 2015, he left his role as co-chairman on CA Technologies’ Board of Directors. He currently serves as the executive chairman of RingLead, a cloud-based data management company.

== Computer Associates ==
Artzt and Charles Wang founded Computer Associates International in 1976 to provide software to users of IBM mainframes. One of its most promising early products was CA-SORT, a utility that helped mainframe users sort, merge and copy files, and whose efficiency allowed the company to grow rapidly.

== RingLead ==
In September 2021, ZoomInfo acquired substantially all of the net assets of RingLead, Inc. for total consideration of $118.0 million, of which $116.9 million was cash. ZoomInfo announced the acquisition on 9 September 2021, describing RingLead as a data orchestration provider.
