= NetQoS =

Network performance software company

NetQoS, which sells network performance management software and services, was co-founded by Joel Trammell in 1999 and acquired by CA Technologies in 2009.

The company's name refers to Network Quality of Service.

Their ReportAnalyzer provides "real-time visibility into network traffic" and seeks to improve network performance.

Offerings introduced shortly before the company was acquired by CA Technologies include:

- Performance Center
- Anomaly Detection
- Network latency calculator

Earlier offerings include:

- SuperAgent
- a software/hardware package to identify applications that use excessive bandwidth

== Notability ==
NetQos' products were cited by over 100 articles regarding NetQos patents and prior art.
