= BlazeMeter =

Continuous testing & performance testing platform (SaaS)

- Type: SaaS
- Genre: Load Testing
- Founded: 2011
- Founder: Alon Girmonsky
- Headquarters: United States
- Website: BlazeMeter.com

BlazeMeter is a continuous testing platform that was acquired in 2021 by Perforce Software, which is based in Minneapolis, Minnesota. It provides enterprise-level GUI functional testing, performance testing, API functional testing, mock services, test data management, API monitoring, and reporting.

== History ==
BlazeMeter was originally founded in 2011 and was acquired by CA Technologies in 2016, which became a subsidiary of Broadcom Inc. in 2018.

In October 2021, BlazeMeter was acquired by Perforce as part of its application quality and testing portfolio.

BlazeMeter is also a major contributor to open-source Apache JMeter, through JMeter plugins, fixes, and documentation.

== Company ==
In December 2011, BlazeMeter announced raising $1.2 million financing from YL Ventures.

BlazeMeter provides developers with tools using the Amazon Elastic Compute Cloud (EC2) service that provides mobile, web application, website, web service, or database testing that can simulate thousands of users visiting a website simultaneously.

BlazeMeter can be extended with a series of custom plug-ins. BlazeMeter provides a free plugin to JMeter, a Drupal module, and a Jenkins CI plugin and Vegeta program for load testing.

In 2012, BlazeMeter was selected by CRN as an "Emerging Cloud Computing Vendor" for 2012 and "One of the 25 Coolest Emerging Vendors For 2012" by CRN and UBM Channel.

In August 2012, BlazeMeter announced a partnership with Acquia a commercial open-source software company providing products, services, and technical support for the open source Drupal content management system.

In May 2013, BlazeMeter was named one of the top testing tools by Dr. Dobbs 'Jolt Awards: The Best Testing Tools.'

The company was acquired by CA Technologies in September 2016. In 2021, it was acquired by Perforce.

== Products ==
BlazeMeter offers many continuous testing capabilities as part of its cloud testing platform, including:

- Performance testing
- Functional testing
- API testing & monitoring
- Mock services (also known as service virtualization)
- Test data creation & management
