= Uccel =

UCCEL Corp, previously called University Computing Company ("UCC"), was a data processing service bureau on the campus of Southern Methodist University in Dallas, Texas. It was founded by the Wyly brothers (Sam and Charles, Jr.) in 1963. The name change in the mid-1980s was brought about by Gregory Liemandt, placed as CEO by the majority stockholder, a Swiss citizen named Walter Haefner through Careal Holding AG of Zürich. By 1972, the company operated a middle-sized datacenter in Troy, Michigan, and a huge facility in Arlington, Texas, based on top-of-the-line IBM/360 (and later IBM/370) processors.

Uccel's "big-ticket item" claim to fame was software called UCC-1/TMS (Tape Management System), an IBM mainframe product for managing the tape library in an OS/MVS operating system environment. In 1980, they developed their second "big hitter" and most profitable product, UCC-7 (job scheduler). The UCC-1, UCC-7, UCC-11 (batch job rerun/restart add-on) suite led the market for tape management and job scheduling.

In 1986, UCCEL Corporation purchased Cambridge Systems Group, Inc., which marketed for SKK, Inc. and their market-leading ACF2 mainframe security product. In June 1987, Uccel was unexpectedly bought out by its archrival, Computer Associates, which aggressively sold directly competing products CA-Dynam/TLMS (tape management), CA-Scheduler and batch job scheduling products originally from Capex Corporation (flagship products "Optimizer" and "TLMS") and Value Software, plus CA-Top Secret (security / mainframe discretionary access control).
