= Computer Associates =

American software company (1976–2018)

CA Technologies, Inc.
- Logo of Computer Associates used from 1985 to 2001

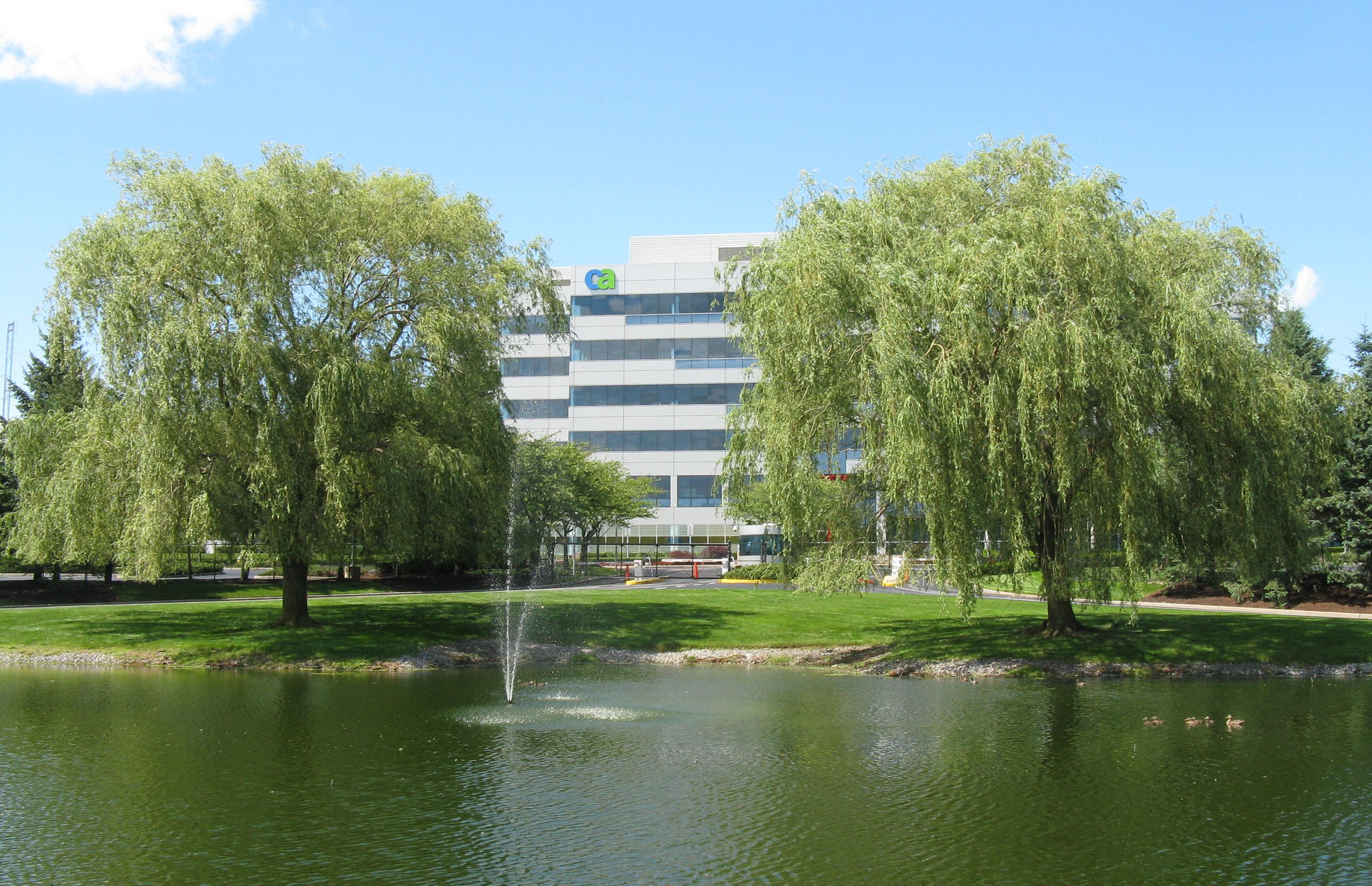
- Headquarters in Islandia, New York (pictured 2009; demolished 2024)
- Formerly: Computer Associates International, Inc. (1976–2006); CA, Inc. (2006–2010)
- Type: Public
- Traded as: Nasdaq: CA (2008–2018); Nasdaq: CASI (1981–1987); NYSE: CA (1987–2008)
- Industry: Software
- Founded: 1976; 50 years ago in New York City, New York, United States
- Founders: Charles B. Wang; Russell Artzt
- Defunct: 2018; 8 years ago
- Fate: Acquired by Broadcom Inc.
- Headquarters: Islandia, New York, United States
- Products: Enterprise software
- Website: www.ca.com

Computer Associates International, Inc., later CA, Inc., and CA Technologies, Inc., was an American multinational enterprise software developer and publisher that existed from 1976 to 2018. CA grew to rank as one of the largest independent software corporations in the world, and at one point was the second largest. The company created system software (and for a while applications software) that ran in IBM mainframe, distributed computing, virtual machine, and cloud computing environments.

The company's primary founder was Charles B. Wang. The main key to Computer Associates' fast growth was the acquisition of many lesser-sized software companies in the IBM mainframe industry segment. CA was known for large-scale dismissals of employees in the acquired firms, and for sometimes extracting cash flow from acquired products rather than enhancing them. Customers of CA often criticized the company for its poor technical support and hostile attitude. CA underwent a major accounting scandal in the early 2000s that led to several past executives being sent to prison. However by the 2010s, several industry organizations ranked CA highly in corporate responsibility and recognition metrics.

Computer Associates had its origins in both Switzerland (Zurich and Geneva) and in the United States (New York City). It was headquartered on Long Island for most of its history, at first Jericho and Garden City in Nassau County, then Suffolk County for two decades in Islandia before moving back to Manhattan in 2014. In 2018, the company was acquired by Broadcom Inc., a semiconductor manufacturer, for nearly $19 billion.

== History ==
=== Origins ===
The origins of Computer Associates International lie in a Swiss software products company and a New York data services company.

Samuel W. Goodner was a Texan who was working for the American businessman Sam Wyly's company, University Computing Company (UCC). UCC had acquired the Swiss computer services company Automation Center A.G., founded by the Swiss businessman Walter Haefner, and Wyly despatched Goodner to Europe to watch over it. By 1970, UCC was experiencing financial difficulties, and Goodner, who admired some of Haefner's management practices, decided to leave and start his own firm that would engage in software product development. A company by the name of Computer Associates A.G. was founded in 1970 by Goodner and was located in Zurich, Switzerland.

Meanwhile, under regulatory pressure in 1969, IBM had announced its decision to unbundle the sale of computer hardware from its software and support services, i.e., mainframe computers from computer programs, etc. The decision opened new markets to competition and provided an opportunity for entrepreneurs to enter the nascent software industry — an opportunity that Goodner sought to exploit by developing and selling software products for the IBM mainframe market.

The new firm Computer Associates was underfinanced, but it did have a customer in the Swiss pharmaceutical giant Hoffmann-La Roche and it had developed a sorting program for Hoffmann-La Roche. The new sort had superior efficiency, and, starting in 1971, Computer Associates began selling in Europe the CA-SORT package as a plug-in replacement for the IBM Sort on IBM System/360 and System/370 mainframe platforms. The firm sought to sell in countries other than Switzerland, and created a holding company for that purpose; distributors were signed up in different European countries, some of which would then be acquired by Computer Associates. As of 1971, Computer Associates International SA was described as being based in Geneva, and Geneva would be its headquarters through the rest of the 1970s. Then in mid-1974, CA-SORT began being distributed and sold in the United States by Pansophic Systems, under the name Pansort. By 1974, the firm was referred to as Computer Associates International Ltd.

In New York City, Standard Data Corporation was a company that was mainly in the service bureau business for electronic data processing. One of the first such companies, it had been in existence since 1959, and was located at 1540 Broadway in Manhattan. In 1973, Standard Data began offering the SYMBUG product for sale, which was a symbolic debugger for the COBOL programming language on the IBM mainframe VM/370 platform. In addition, by October 1974, Standard Data was advertising several other products for VM/CMS, including VM/370 ISAM, an emulation of OS ISAM in VM/CMS, as well as SYMBUG for other languages. Eventually Standard Data created a Software Products Division, of which Charles B. Wang was a vice-president. Wang too sought to take advantage of the IBM unbundling decision by developing and marketing software products for the IBM mainframe.

In January 1976, an agreement was signed whereby Pansophic Systems relinquished U.S. rights to CA-SORT and Standard Data Corporation took those exclusive rights over and in the so doing, restored the product name to its European form. Standard Data also gained U.S. rights to a report generator package called EARL (for Easy Access Report Language).

=== 1970s ===
Then in October 1976, a merger was announced between Computer Associates International Ltd and the Software Products Division of Standard Data Corporation, with this merger creating a new entity, Computer Associates, Inc., with Wang as president.

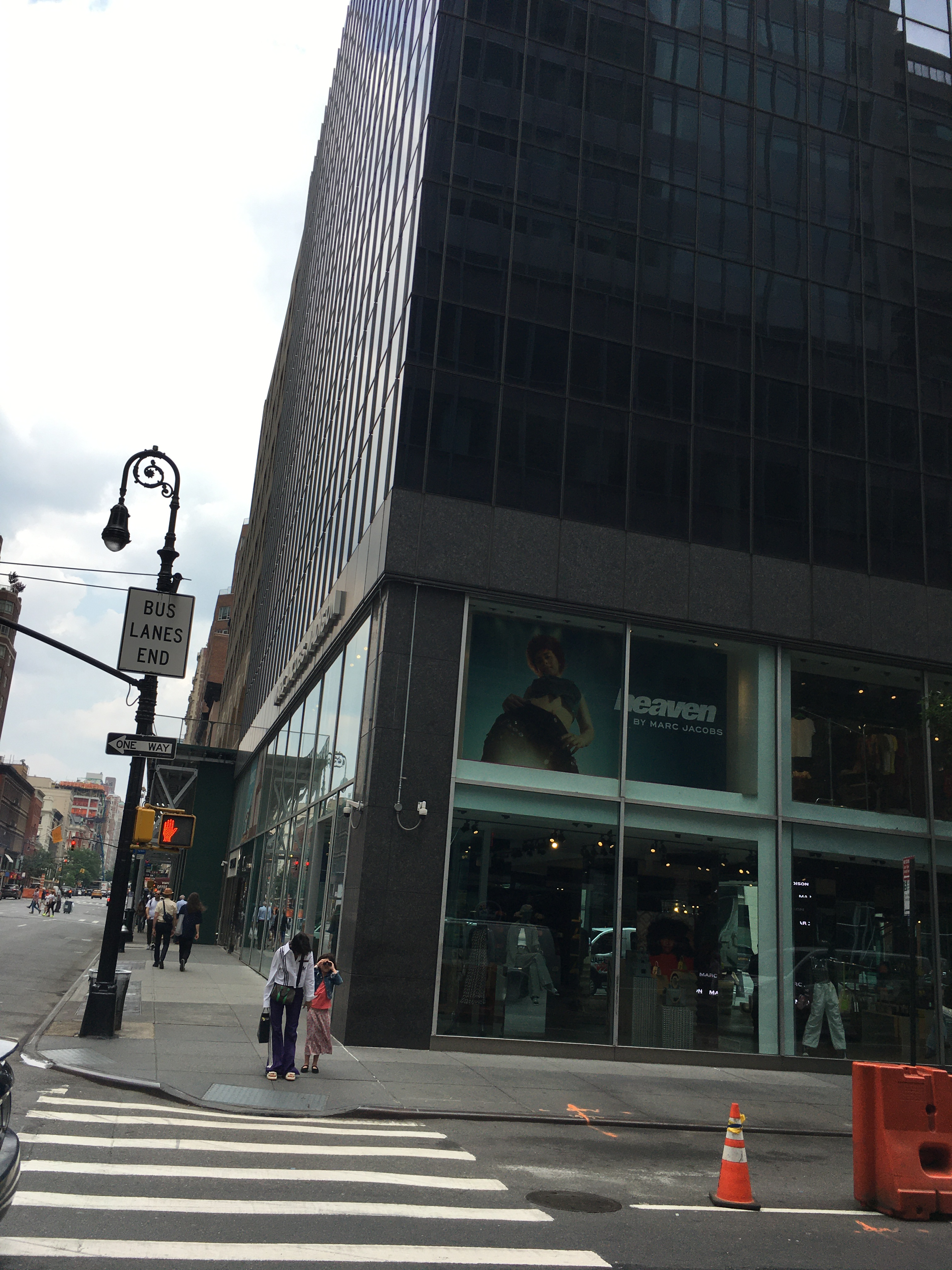
Computer Associates' first offices were at 655 Madison Avenue in Manhattan (here seen in 2023).

The newly created company would continue to market CA-SORT in the United States and in the rest of the Western hemisphere, while the existing European firm would market some of Standard Data's products such as SYMBUG. The new company had an office at 655 Madison Avenue. (The main part of Standard Data Corporation continued on as a company, supplying computer services for several kinds of organizations; the company persisted into the 2010s, but its website does not appear to have been accessible after 2018.)

It is thus to 1976 that the creation of what would become the well-known Computer Associates company is usually dated. This new venture began with four employees. One of them was Russell Artzt, who had met Wang in college, worked with him at Standard Data Corporation, was responsible for programming some of the early software products the new company was offering. Artzt is accordingly considered a co-founder of the well-known Computer Associates.

But that would still be awaiting. Soon, the new American venture's name would appear as Trans-American Computer Associates, Inc., in the sense that by September 1977, the company's advertisements were copyrighted to Trans-American Computer Associates, Inc., while CA-SORT 77 was copyrighted to Computer Associates International Ltd. For instance, DYNAM/D was a disk utility for IBM mainframes running DOS and DOS/VS that did disk space management, disk cataloguing, and other such functions; announced in 1977, its trademark belonged to Trans-American Computer Associates, indicating it was developed in America rather than Europe.

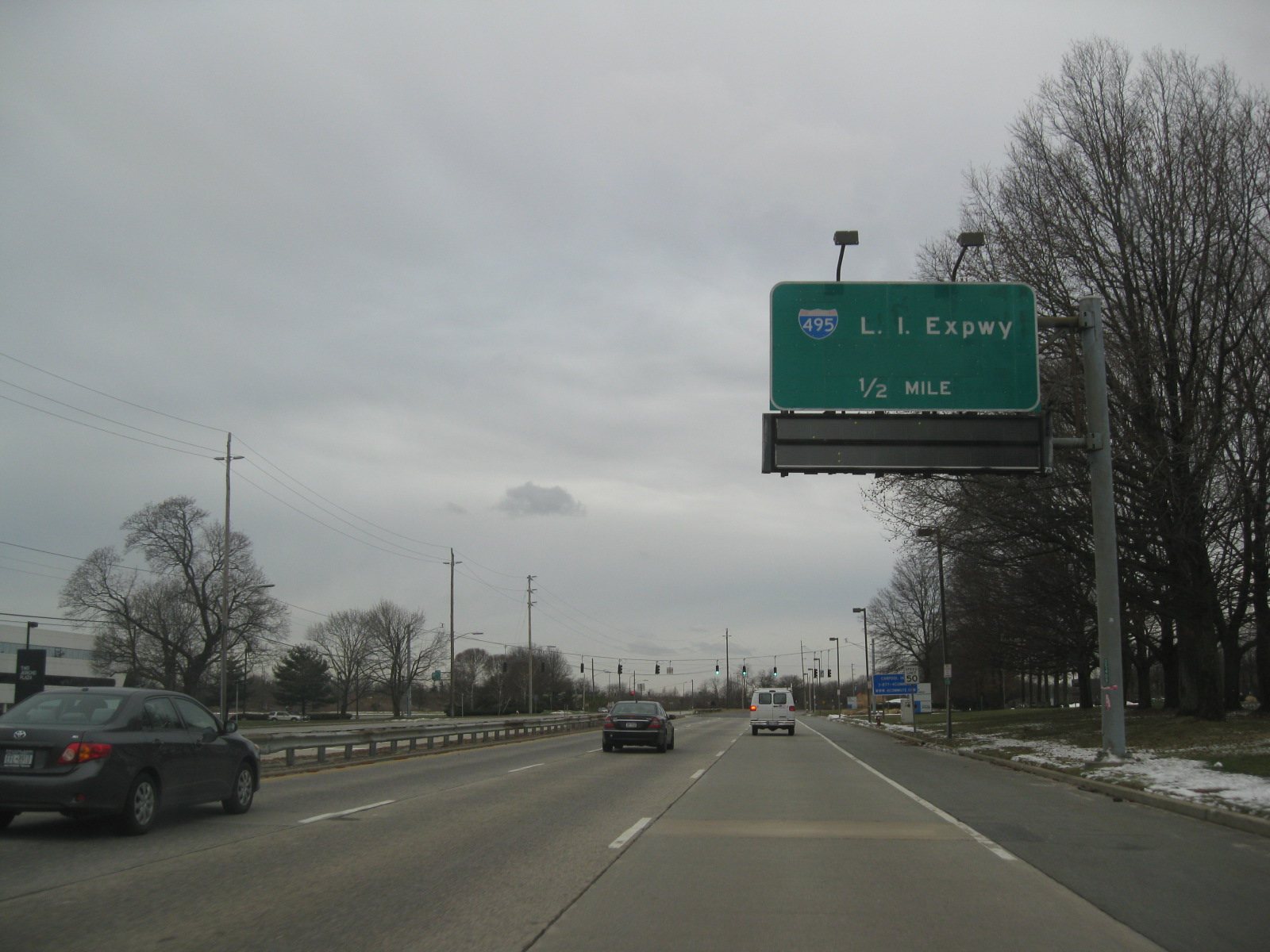
CA's Jericho office was a short distance away from this 2010 scene on Jericho Turnpike.

In 1979, offices of the American company were moved to Long Island at Jericho, New York, at 125 Jericho Turnpike.

By 1980, the overall Computer Associates International had some 300 employees across its locations around the globe and was selling 12 different products to what it said were 9,000 different customer installation sites. Sales from the United States were the biggest market for the company. In 1980, Wang bought out the Swiss parent company and Computer Associates International, Inc. became his.

=== 1980s ===
Computer Associates had an IPO in 1981 that garnered the company a modest $3.2 million. Its stock traded on the NASDAQ using the stock symbol "CASI".

The first significant acquisition in CA's history took place in 1982, when it merged with Capex Corporation, resulting in a 50 percent increase in CA's revenues. Both CA and Capex made software products for the IBM mainframe, but while by CA's own marketing statements CA had visibility and success in software products for IBM's DOS mainframe operating system, potential customers did not think CA was strong in products for the IBM OS mainframe operating system. In contrast, this was an area where Capex had established itself.

The acquisition of Capex was generally viewed as having been successful. It was the start of what was to become a buying spree for Computer Associates over the next several years. The company specialized in going after third-party mainframe software.

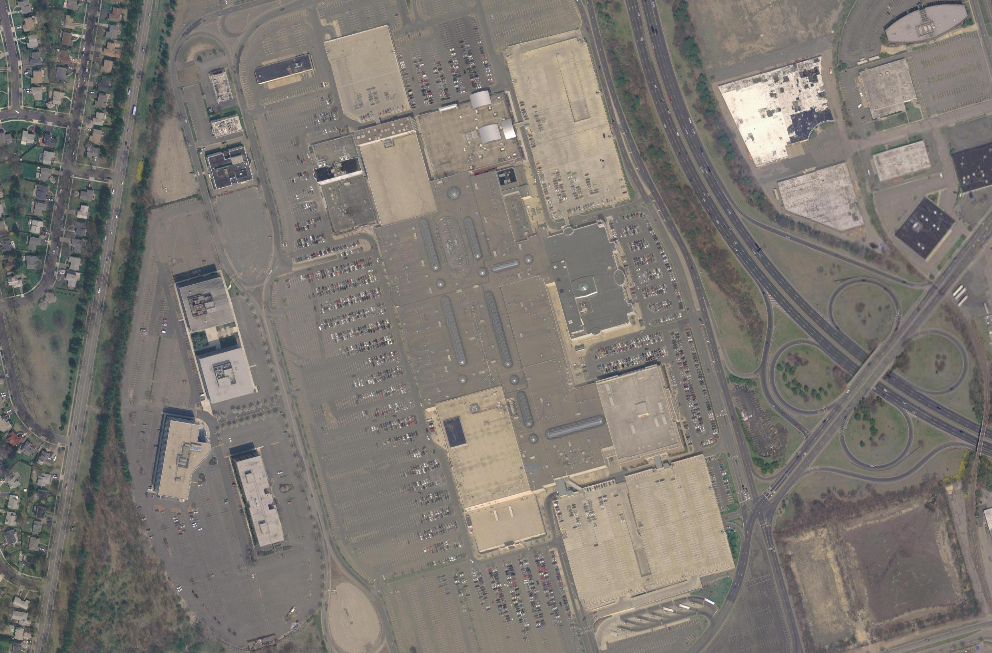
CA's main Garden City office was just south of Roosevelt Field, seen here in a satellite view.

By 1986, Computer Associates had moved its headquarters again, to Garden City. They would come to be situated in five other buildings within Nassau County as well. Revenue that year was $265 million, with income of more than $30 million. Estimated personal computer software revenue was between $60 to $70 million.

CA's strategy for growth reached a new level with its deal for Uccel in 1987, which valued at $800 million was an order of magnitude larger than any of its previous acquisitions. Uccel was a new name for UCC, which Haefner had gained control of from Wyly in 1976 and which had undergone ups and downs in the years since. Of Uccel's existing staff of 1,200 people, 550 were let go; this kind of harsh post-acquisition reduction measure was typical for the company and became a part of CA's public image. Haefner became Computer Associates' largest individual shareholder, with a stake that comprised about 25 percent of the company.

In 1987, CA's stock began trading on the New York Stock Exchange using the ticker symbol "CA". In 1988, the company purchased the principal software product of Consco.

As the decade ended, CA became the first software company after Microsoft to exceed $1 billion in sales. Information Week listed Computer Associates ahead of Microsoft in a 1990 roundup titled "Software's Heavy Hitters".

=== 1990s ===
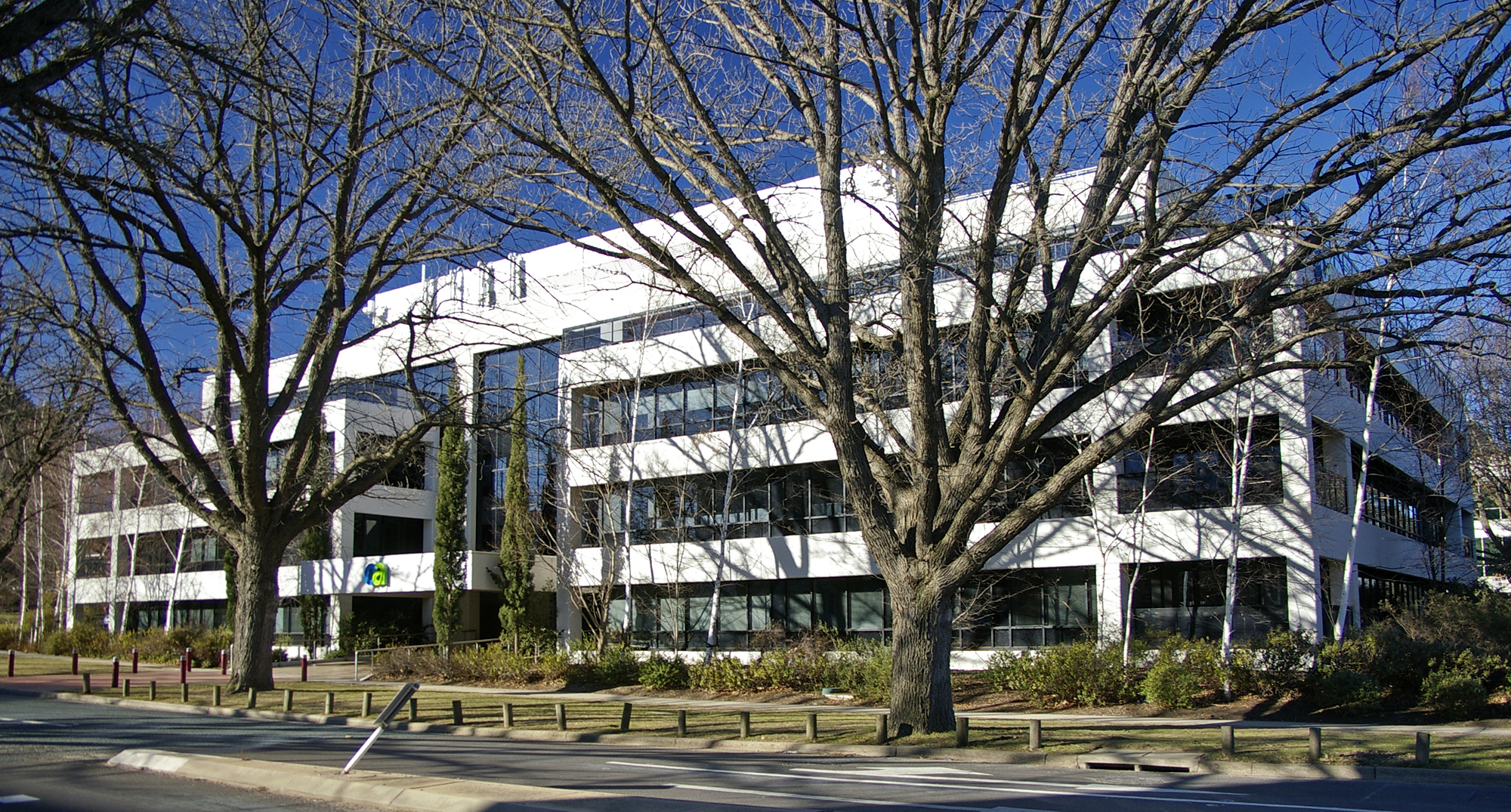
CA House in Canberra, Australia, as seen in 2009

Early in the decade, Computer Associates was forced to address criticism of the company as well as a sharp decline in its stock price, which fell more than 50 percent during 1990. The ensuing changes included pushing into foreign markets (Japan, Canada, Africa, Latin America), reforming how the company charged its customers for software maintenance, and improving compatibility with products from other vendors, such as Hewlett-Packard (HP), Apple Computer, and Digital Equipment Corporation (DEC). In addition, the company was not immune to the effects of the early 1990s recession, and by October 1991 the stock was down by around 70 percent from its earlier peak in May 1989. At this point, CA had some 7,000 employees, and around $1.4 billion in sales,

In 1991, CA acquired Pansophic Systems.

After 2 1/2 years of planning and construction, the company began moving its headquarters to Islandia, New York in Suffolk County in 1992, consolidating all of the Nassau County operations. There it would occupy a large corporate campus with three office buildings. By this juncture, CA was Long Island's second largest private employer, after Grumman Aerospace, and Suffolk County politicians had given CA substantial tax abatements and assistance with construction financing to lure the company there.

In 1994, CA acquired the ASK Group and continued to offer the Ingres database management system under a variety of brand names.

In 1992, the company was sued by Electronic Data Systems (EDS), a CA customer. EDS accused CA of breach of contract, misuse of copyright and violations of antitrust laws. CA filed a counterclaim, also alleging breach of contract, including copyright infringement and misappropriation of trade secrets. The companies reached a settlement in 1996.

In 1995, Legent Corporation was acquired for $1.78 billion, the biggest-ever acquisition in the software industry at that time, and Cheyenne Software for $1.2 billion in 1996. CA executed the software industry's then-largest acquisition ($3.5 billion) via Platinum Technology International in 1999.

In 1998, an unsuccessful and hostile takeover bid by CA for computer consulting firm Computer Sciences Corporation (CSC) prompted a bribery suit by CSC's chairman Van Honeycutt against CA's founder and then CEO, Charles Wang.

By the end of the 1990s, Computer Associates was the dominant company among providers of utility software tools for the mainframe. Personal computer software firms such as Microsoft, Lotus Development, and WordPerfect Corporation were much more recognizable as names to the general public. but while this mainframe industry segment was not widely known, it was a remuneratively rewarding one. A profile in Business Week in 1996 was headlined "Computer Associates: Sexy? No. Profitable? You Bet ", and that accurately conveyed the company's place in the industry.

In May 1998 stock grants were issued to Wang and two others together worth $1.1 billion at the time. In 1999, Wang received the largest bonus in history at that time from a public company. The receipt of a $670 million stock grant that dated to the vesting of a 1995 stock option occurred while the company faced a slowdown in European markets and an economic slump in Asia, both of which had affected CA's earnings and stock price. The stock grants thus became quite controversial. In total, the company took a $675 million after-tax charge for $1.1 billion in payouts to Wang and other top CA executives.

=== Company culture ===
Computer Associates received poor marks for customer relations, with a reputation of being more interested in making sales than providing support afterward. To some extent, the CA sales force regarded customers as foes. In 2001, The New York Times wrote that "Computer Associates has infuriated clients with high prices and poor technical support." Fortune wrote, "For all its ubiquity inside the tech departments of corporate America, CA had a horrendous reputation. Where Microsoft has long been the most feared software company, the old CA claimed the title of most despised – not by competitors but by its own customers."

Detractors of CA accused it of putting newly acquired software products into maintenance mode and milking them for cash flow. The products themselves were expensive and central to what corporate IT departments were doing, and so customers found it difficult to move away from CA. As Fortune wrote, "These products made it the barnacle of corporate America: Once you had CA software onboard, it was so onerous and expensive to pull it out that few customers ever did. That led to a lot of steady cash flow – and to arrogance on the part of CA's management." Or as The Register wrote, "CA used acquisitions to grow its portfolio.... Along the way it acquired a reputation as the place decent software goes to die." Nonetheless, as the Times noted in 2001: "To be sure, complaints about Computer Associates' prices and customer support have been around almost as long as the company, and it has always outlasted its detractors."

As some industry analysts observed, the culture of Computer Associates reflected Wang's personality and background, that of an immigrant educated at the non-elite Queens College, City University of New York. Wang did not admire or belong to the Silicon Valley mindset and either insulted or avoided its ecosystem of industry analysts and venture capitalists. The company's sales force was composed largely of people with blue-collar backgrounds from New York's outer boroughs and Long Island. With them, CA had a reputation for being, as BusinessWeek wrote, "smart, aggressive, and consistently profitable".

Internally, as the Times wrote, "Over the years, [the company] has gained a reputation as a callous employer that dismisses workers without warning while top executives take home eight- and sometimes nine-figure pay packages." In particular, Computer Associates had a reputation for mass dismissals within companies it had taken over. This was the case with Applied Data Research, for instance, as some 200 employees from its Montgomery Township, New Jersey facility were let go on a single morning in 1988. Similarly, at Cullinet, around 400 employees, comprising a quarter of the company's workforce were told to clear out their desks on a day in 1989. As Sam Wyly, the head of Sterling Software, reflected upon his decision in 2000 to sell that company to Computer Associates: "It wasn't easy for us because of our concern about the CA culture. It wasn't the ideal end place for our products and people. We agonized over that, but our overriding duty was to the shareholders, so we went ahead with the deal."

A contrarian view of Computer Associates was given by computer industry historian Martin Campbell-Kelly, writing around 2001, who gave the company credit for continuing to enhance the DATACOM/DB and IDMS database products it had acquired and for doing the work to have its databases and utility products be able to interoperate. Campbell also saw the act of staffing reductions as "rationalization" of existing businesses that in some cases were not performing well. A hybrid characterization was given in 2002 by Pansophic Systems founder Joseph A. Piscopo, who said that while his company, acquired in 1991, had suffered the typical fate of CA reducing it to just the minimal staff needed to keep maintenance revenue going, in a few cases CA did actually invest in companies it acquired as part of an internal product development strategy, with Cheyenne Software being one such instance.

=== Accounting scandal ===
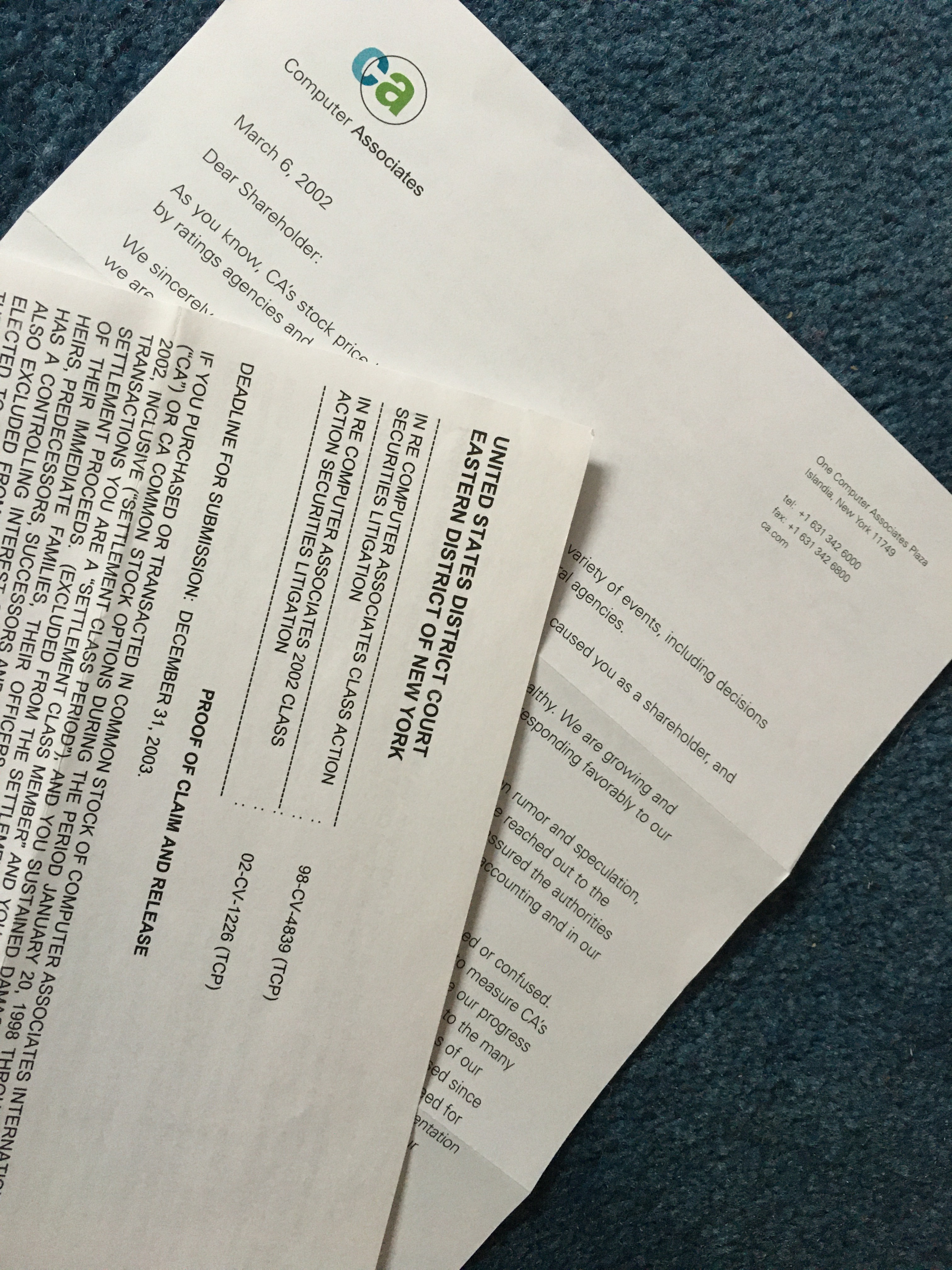
A letter to shareholders from Wang and Kumar in 2002, maintaining that the company was not in trouble, and a court-approved letter to shareholders in 2003, after CA reached a settlement on charges of securities fraud.

By 2000, Computer Associates had acquired on the order of magnitude of 200 companies. In that year, Sanjay Kumar replaced Wang as chief executive officer, with the latter remaining as chairman of Computer Associates' board of directors. Then in 2002, Wang departed completely and Kumar became chairman as well.

In 2000, a shareholder-based class-action lawsuit accused CA of misstating more than $500 million in revenue in its 1998 and 1999 fiscal years in order to artificially inflate its stock price. In 2001, a proxy battle ensued between the board of directors and shareholders led by Wyly, who was unhappy with how CA was being run and especially with how his acquired Sterling Software was being treated. Wyly was not trying to buy the company, but rather trying to get shareholders to elect a new board of directors that would include him as chair. Wyly had hopes of appealing to Haefner, as their business relationship dated back to the 1960s, but Haefner stayed loyal to Wang. In the end, Wyly's two attempts failed; he gave up the struggle in 2002 and received a $10 million payment that was characterized as "greenmail" by some, but not all, industry analysts.

Meanwhile, by early 2002 it was public knowledge that the Securities and Exchange Commission (SEC) and the U.S. Attorney's Office for the Eastern District of New York had instantiated investigations as to whether CA had engaged in accounting fraud. CA had to cancel a plan to refinance its debt after Moody's Investors Service indicated it might downgrade the company's credit rating, an action that the service soon took. Later in 2002 the U.S. Department of Justice limited CA's acquisitions.

The investigation by the SEC resulted in charges against the company and some of its former top executives. The SEC alleged that from 1998 to 2000, CA routinely kept its books open to include quarterly revenue from contracts executed after the quarter ended in order to meet Wall Street analysts' expectations. As one account from the Wharton School of the University of Pennsylvania wrote, "The SEC said the goal was to meet or beat per-share earnings estimates of Wall Street analysts, a key to keeping a company's stock price rising. ... In all, the company prematurely reported $3.3 billion in revenues from 363 software contracts. ... Moreover, executives at Computer Associates were big shareholders themselves, and many held enormous blocks of stock options. They therefore had a big financial stake in the share price, and thus an incentive to inflate results."

Kumar resigned as CEO and chairman of the company in 2004, staying on as chief software architect, then two months later left the company completely. Following the change in executive leadership, the company restated its earnings for 2000 and 2001 due to the unaccepted revenues policies. Around the same time in 2004, the company avoided indictment for involvement in the 35 day month accounting scandal by reaching a settlement with the SEC and Department of Justice, in which CA agreed to pay $225 million in restitution to shareholders and reform its corporate governance and financial accounting controls.

Eight CA executives pleaded guilty to fraud or obstruction of justice charges, and several received prison terms. Most notably, in 2006 former CEO and chairman Kumar was sentenced to 12 years in prison and fined $8 million for his role in the massive accounting fraud at Computer Associates. The company subsequently made sweeping changes through virtually all of its senior leadership positions. Overall the company spent over $500 million on investigations and fines.

=== 2000s ===
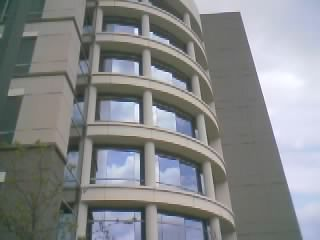
Computer Associates building in Plano, Texas, as seen in 2005

By 2001, Computer Associates was the fourth-biggest among independent software companies and had 18,000 employees. Attempts to diversify away from the mainframe business had not met with much success.

CA started the India Technology Centre in Hyderabad on December 10, 2003. In 2004, CA appointed ex-IBM employee John Swainson as CEO. Swainson tried to turn things around, but was hampered by trouble that the company had in fixing its internal finance and accounting systems.

During this time, the company presented its Enterprise IT Management (EITM) vision to unify and simplify enterprise-wide IT By 2006, the company had 15,000 employees.

The company's original name of Computer Associates International, Inc. was changed to CA, Inc. in January 2006. The company said that the change reflected a changed focus towards helping customers "simplify the management of enterprise-wide IT"; it also came shortly before Kumar pleaded guilty to the array of charges against him.

From May 2008 on, CA was a Nasdaq-100 company.

On September 1, 2009, CA announced CEO John Swainson's decision to retire by the end of the year. On January 28, 2010, CA announced that William E. McCracken would be its chairman of the board and chief executive officer.

=== 2010s ===
Final logo of CA Technologies by Lippincott, used from 2010 to 2018

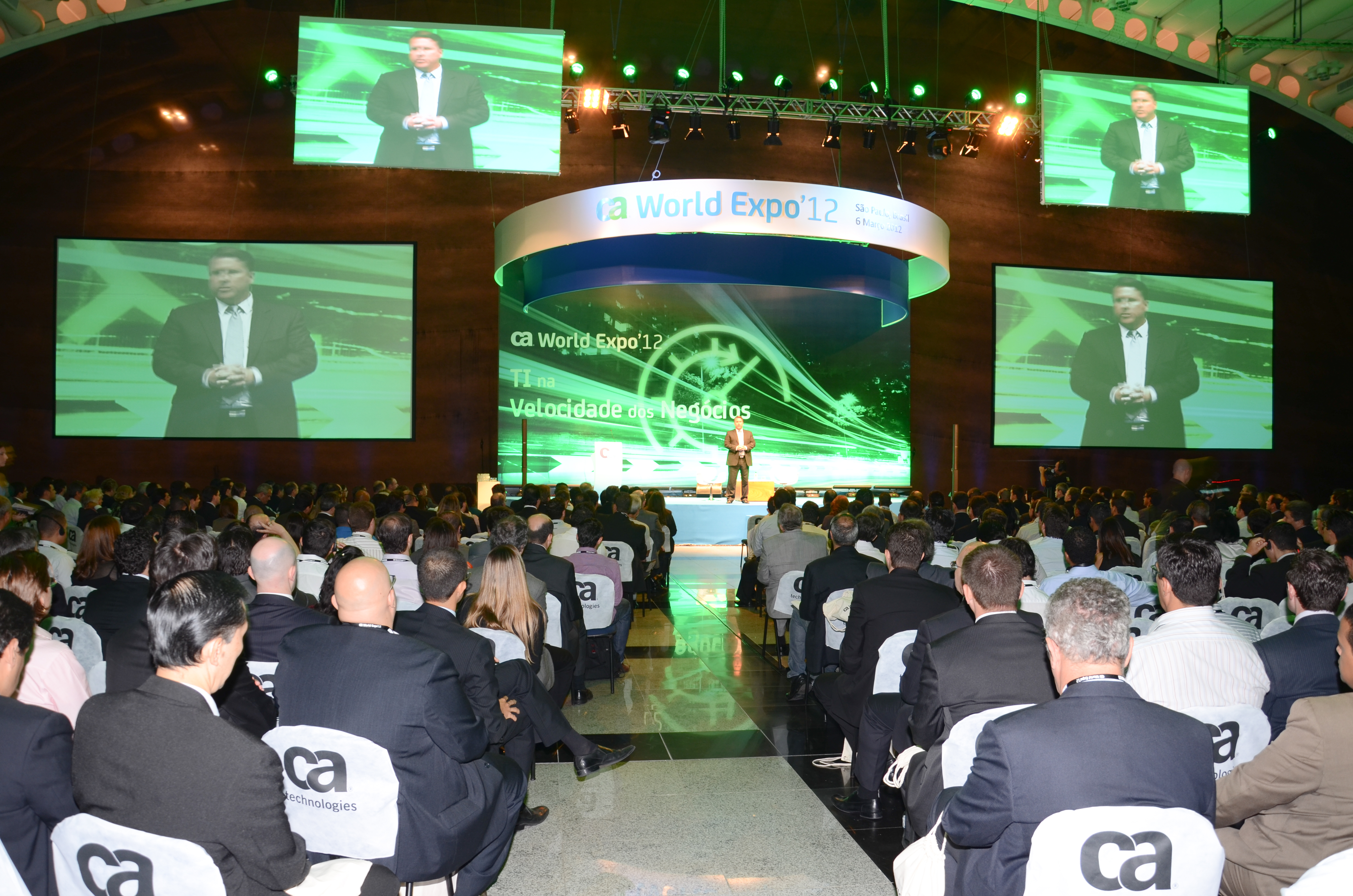
A keynote address at the CA World Expo '12 conference in São Paulo, Brazil

In May 2010, at the opening of the CA World 2010 conference in Las Vegas, the company announced it was changing its name again, to CA Technologies. For a reason, the company said the new name "reflects the full breadth and depth of what the company offers".

In 2010, the company acquired eight companies to support its cloud computing strategy: 3Tera, Nimsoft, NetQoS, Oblicore, Cassatt, 4Base Technology, Arcot Systems, and Hyperformix. It also acquired Replay Solutions. In 2011, CA acquired ITKO for $330 million. Two years later, it acquired app deployment and management company Nolio for approximately $40 million, as well as Layer7.

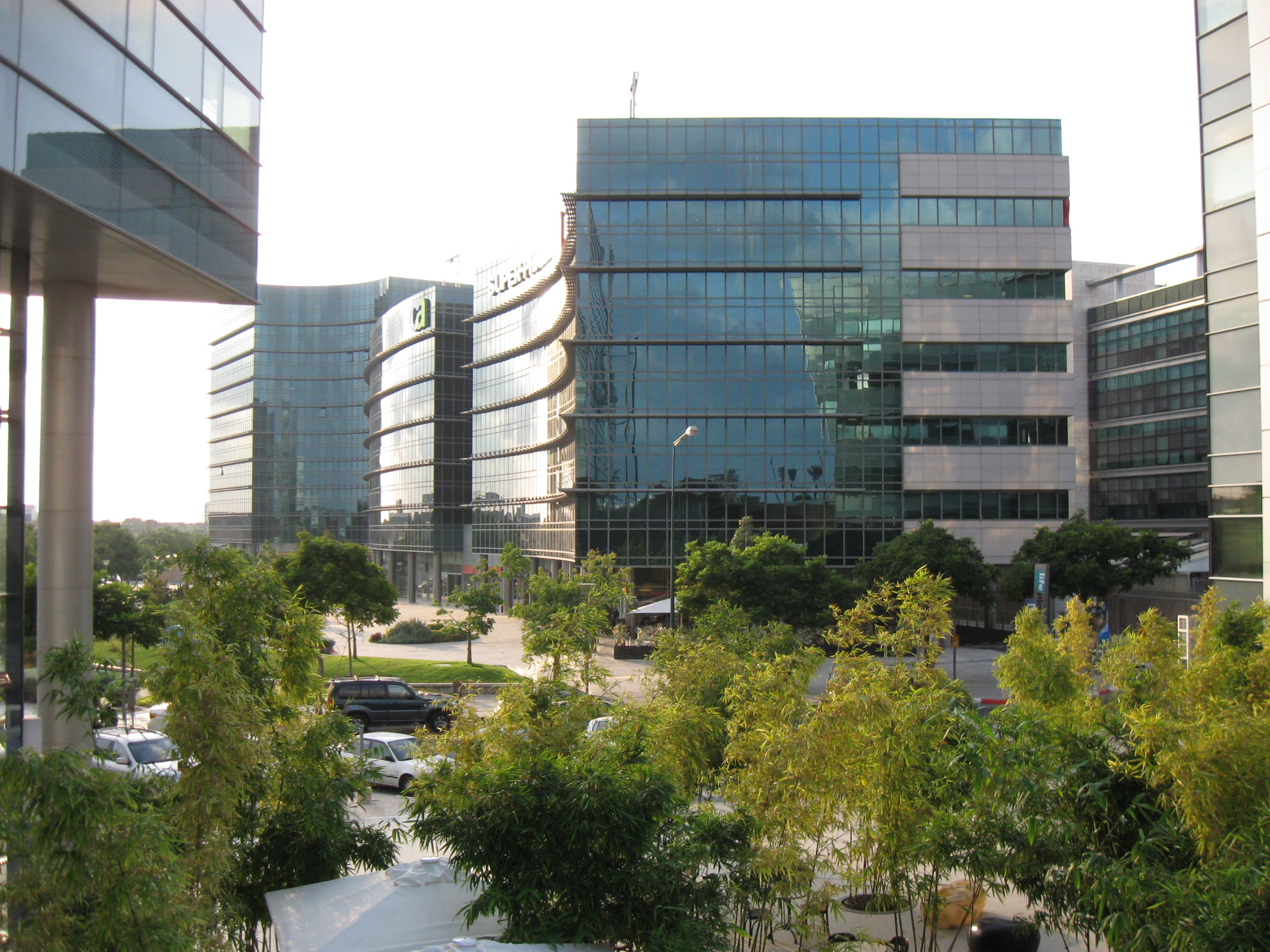
CA building (left-center) in Herzliya, Israel, as seen in 2010

The company had been a provider of anti-virus and Internet security commercial software programs for personal computers during its venture into the business-to-consumer market. In 2011, CA sold its antivirus properties to Updata Partners, which spun the division off as Total Defense. After the spinoff, CA became primarily known again for its business-to-business mainframe and distributed (client/server, etc.) information technology infrastructure applications.

On January 7, 2013, CA Technologies announced that Michael P. Gregoire would be a member of the board and new chief executive officer. In June 2014, CA Technologies moved its headquarters, without an announcement, from Islandia in Suffolk County, to 520 Madison Avenue in New York City.

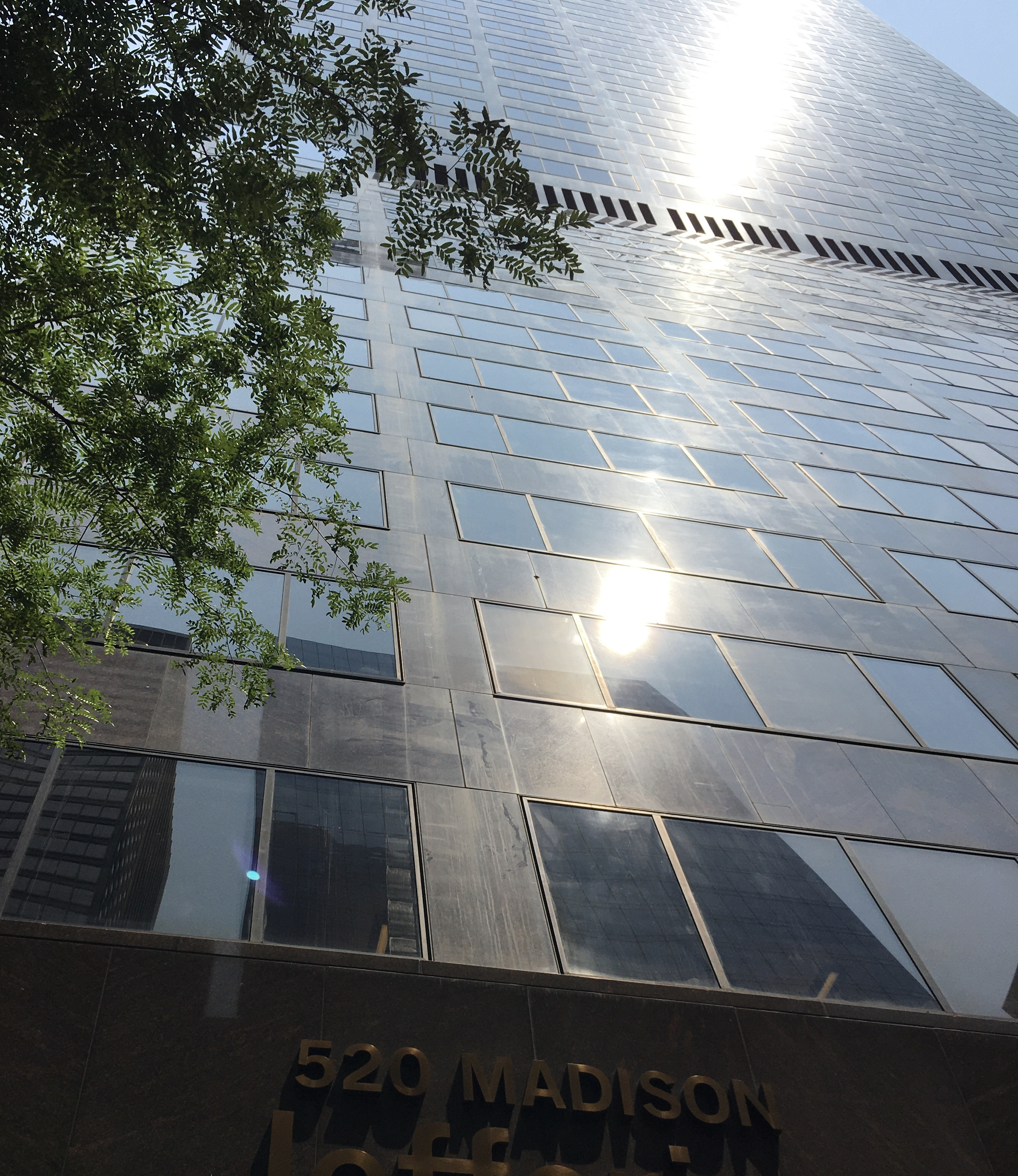
The final headquarters office for CA was at 520 Madison Avenue in Manhattan (here seen in 2023).

In 2015, the company made four acquisitions, including Rally software for $480 million, Unifyalm, Gridtools, Idmlogic, and Xceedium.

In 2016, CA acquired Blazemeter, Automic, Veracode, and Runscope in 2017.

CA Technologies posted $4.2 billion in revenue for fiscal year 2018 (ending March 31, 2018). Mainframe products and services was still the major of CA's income, comprising about $2.2 billion in the fiscal year, while its so-called enterprise solutions market segment contributed some $1.75 billion and its services business around $0.3 billion. As of 2018, CA Technologies maintained offices in more than 40 countries and employed approximately 11,300 people.

On August 8, 2018, CEO Mike Gregoire was elected as chairman of CA Technologies board of directors, replacing retiring chairman Art Weinbach.

=== Acquisition by Broadcom ===
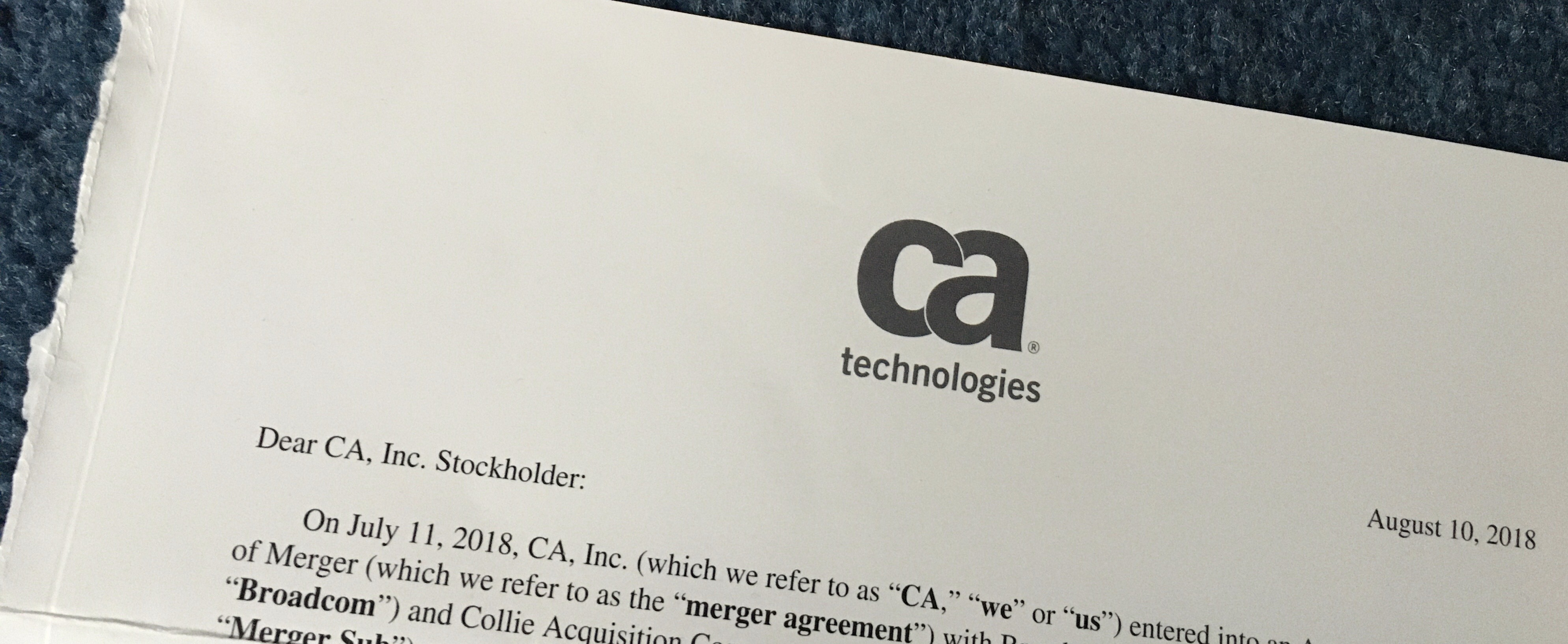
Letter to shareholders asking for approval of acquisition by Broadcom

On July 11, 2018, Broadcom Inc. announced it would acquire CA Technologies for $18.9 billion in cash. CA's head, Mike Gregoire, said, "This combination aligns our expertise in software with Broadcom's leadership in the semiconductor industry." The acquisition puzzled some industry observers, since the two companies' businesses seemed to have little in common. One analyst acknowledged that Broadcom could generate cash from the CA operations, but commented: "Financially, it can make sense. But what's the strategic logic?" The Register termed it the "Weirdest. Acquisition. Ever." The transaction was closed on November 5, 2018.

The irony of the reversal of positions did not go unnoticed, with The Register saying "CA Technologies, long a byword for making acquisitions, has been acquired by Broadcom." And Broadcom, like CA, had a reputation for making large reductions in the companies it had just acquired. Immediately after the acquisition closed, Broadcom laid off former CA Technologies workers in Silicon Valley and Plano, Texas. It also laid off 262 former CA Technologies employees in Islandia and some in Manhattan. Then, Long Island-based Newsday reported that about 40 percent of all CA employees in the United States would be laid off, adding up to almost 2,000 people being let go. Not long after the Broadcom acquisition, the large Computer Associates campus in Islandia was abandoned. With its new owners opting to redevelop the property, the former CA Technologies headquarters was imploded via controlled explosion in January 2024.

== Corporate responsibility and recognition ==
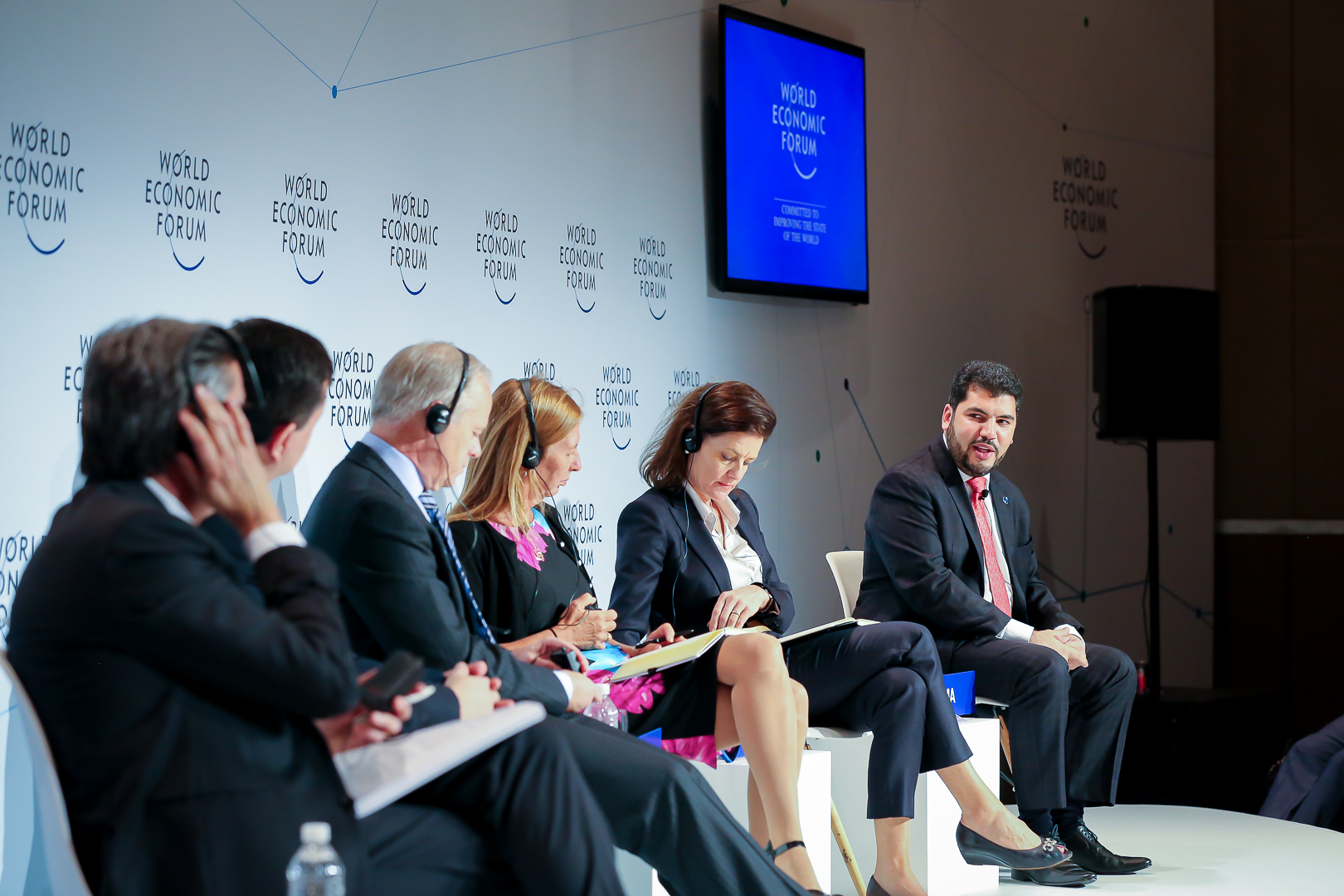
CEO Michael Gregoire (third from left) listening at the World Economic Forum on Latin America, 2018

During the mid-1990s, Computer Associates realized it had an image problem, both externally and internally, and consequently created a public relations department within the company and also adopted some more employee-friendly human resources policies.

=== Sustainability ===
In 2010, CA was listed among the greenest companies by Newsweek's Green rankings. CA has been named a component of the Dow Jones Sustainability Indexes (DJSI) for seven years, from 2012 to 2018. In 2015 and 2016, CA was ranked as one of America's Greenest companies by Newsweek.

In 2017, the company scored an A− from CDP, the world's most comprehensive rating of companies leading on environmental action, for environmental performance and disclosure.

According to a corporate sustainability report released by the company in 2018, CA reduced its Greenhouse Gas Footprint by more than 35 percent since 2006. It received the Climate Leadership Award in Excellence in GHG Management in 2018, and was included in Barron's 100 Most Sustainable Companies in 2018 as well.

In February 2018, CA was named one of the World's Most Ethical Companies by Ethisphere Institute for the third consecutive year.

=== Equality and diversity ===
CA Technologies was named one of the best companies for multicultural women by Working Mother Magazine for four consecutive years, from 2015 to 2018 as well as one of the 100 Best Companies from 2015 to 2017. The company was also awarded 4.3 of 5 stars by InHerSight as one of the Top 10 IT Companies for Women in 2017. In 2015 and 2016, Fatherly.com ranked CA as one of the Best Places to Work for New Dads.

In 2018, CA was named a National Association for Female Executives top company for executive women. CA was also included in the Bloomberg Gender-Equality Index (GEI) in 2018.

In 2018, for the fourth consecutive year, the Human Rights Campaign Foundation ranked CA as one of the Best Places to Work for LGBTQ+ Equality.

CA CEO Mike Gregoire is a signatory of the CEO Action for Diversity and Inclusion pledge.

=== Work environments ===
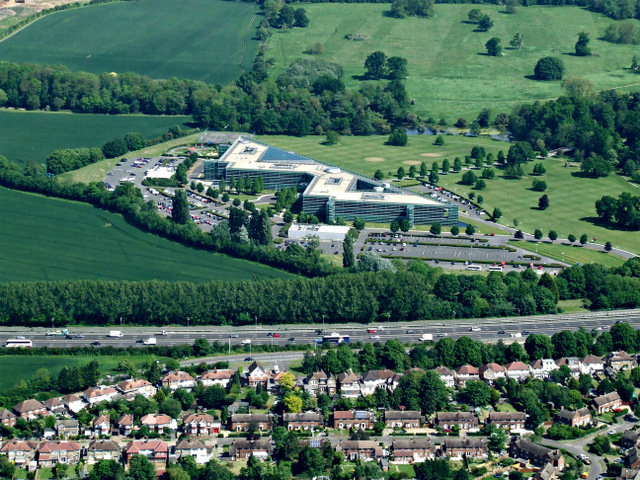
CA European HQ, Berkshire UK, as seen in 2014

For four consecutive years, 2015–2018, CA was named by Computerworld as one of the Best Places to Work in IT. In 2017, it was named to the Forbes list of America's Best Employers and recognized with a STAR Award for Leadership and Innovation by the Technology Services Industry Association (TSIA).

In 2018, CA was named to the Thomson Reuters World's Top 100 Technology companies and for six consecutive years has been the recipient of the NorthFace ScoreBoard Award from Customer Relationship Management Institute (CRMI).

== Acquisitions ==
CA had a long history of acquisitions in the software industry. It grew its portfolio and became successful through acquiring many companies in disparate fields, including enterprise system monitoring and management, ID management, security, and anti-virus, among others.

== See also ==
- CA IT Process Automation Manager
- Computer Associates International, Inc. v. Altai, Inc.
- Tech companies in the New York metropolitan area
