= Fischer House (Lake Providence, Louisiana) =

Historic house in Louisiana, United States

- U.S. National Register of Historic Places
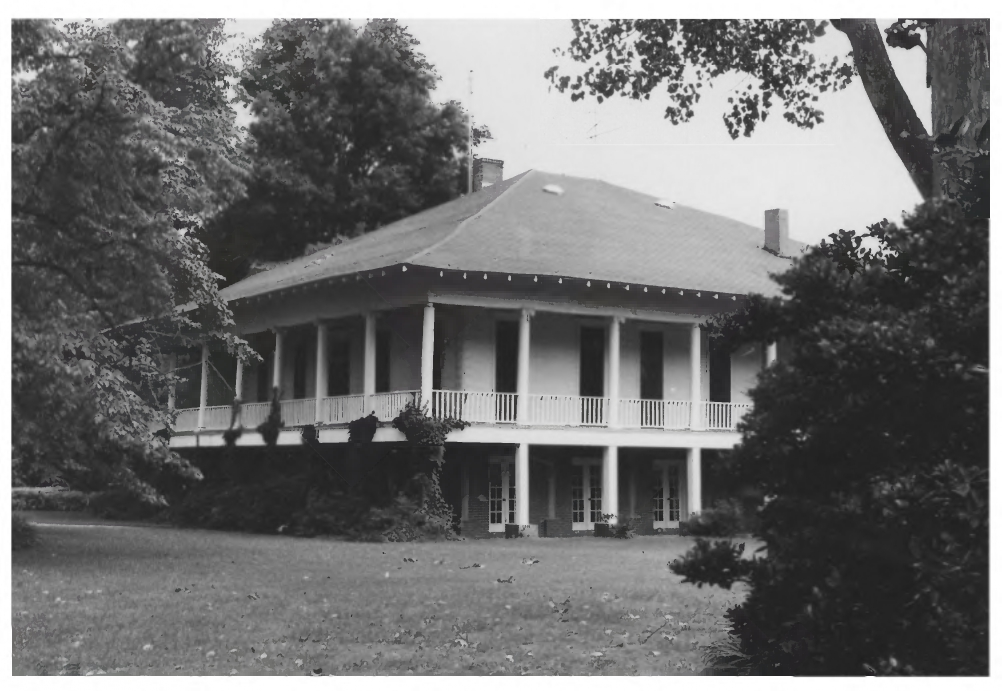

- Location within Louisiana Location within the United States
- Location: Harding Street, Lake Providence, Louisiana
- Coordinates: 32°48′38″N 91°11′10″W
- Area: 3 acres (1.2 ha)
- Built: c.1905
- Built by: Joseph L. Fischer
- Architectural style: Colonial Revival
- MPS: Lake Providence MRA
- NRHP reference No.: 80001726
- Added to NRHP: January 11, 1980

The Fischer House is a historic mansion located along Harding Street in Lake Providence in East Carroll Parish, Louisiana.

It was built in c.1905 by lumber company owner Joseph L. Fischer. The house is notable architecturally for its open floor plan, preceding the Modernist movement by decades. Its main living area features dark wood wainscoting and a massive fireplace. It has galleries on at least two sides, 60 feet (18 m) and 70 feet (21 m) long. The house was owned by the Pittman family during 1920-29 and 1938–68. It was purchased by the Lake Providence American Legion in 1929. The house served as a social center for the Lake Providence community, both as used by the Fischers and by the American Legionnaires. Its lake front became a public swim area with a pier for public fishing.

The house was individually listed on the National Register of Historic Places on January 11, 1980. It was also enlisted along with several other Lake Providence properties and districts in the Lake Providence MRA on October 3, 1980.

== See also ==
- National Register of Historic Places listings in East Carroll Parish, Louisiana
- Lake Providence Commercial Historic District
- Lake Providence Residential Historic District
- Arlington Plantation
- Nelson House
- Old Courthouse Square
