= Old Courthouse Square (Lake Providence, Louisiana) =

- U.S. National Register of Historic Places
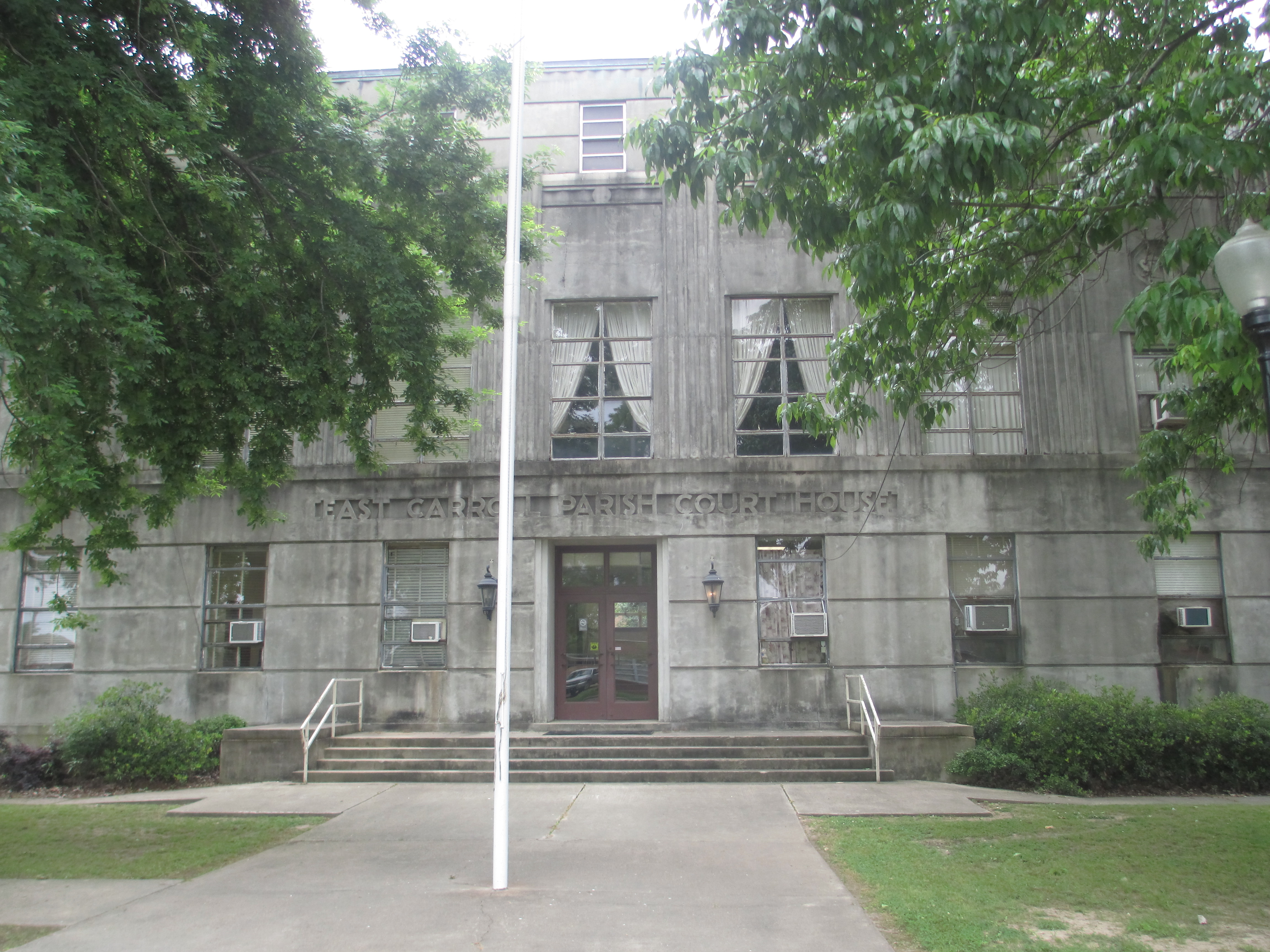
- East Carroll Parish Courthouse

- Location within Louisiana Location within the United States
- Interactive map showing the location of Old Courthouse Square
- Location: Bounded by 1st Street, Hood Street, 2nd Street and Davis Street, Lake Providence, Louisiana
- Coordinates: 32°48′13″N 91°10′24″W
- Area: 2 acres (0.81 ha)
- Built: 1889
- Architectural style: Romanesque Revival
- MPS: Lake Providence MRA
- NRHP reference No.: 80001728
- Added to NRHP: October 3, 1980

The Old Courthouse Square in Lake Providence, Louisiana, in East Carroll Parish, was listed on the National Register of Historic Places on October 3, 1980.

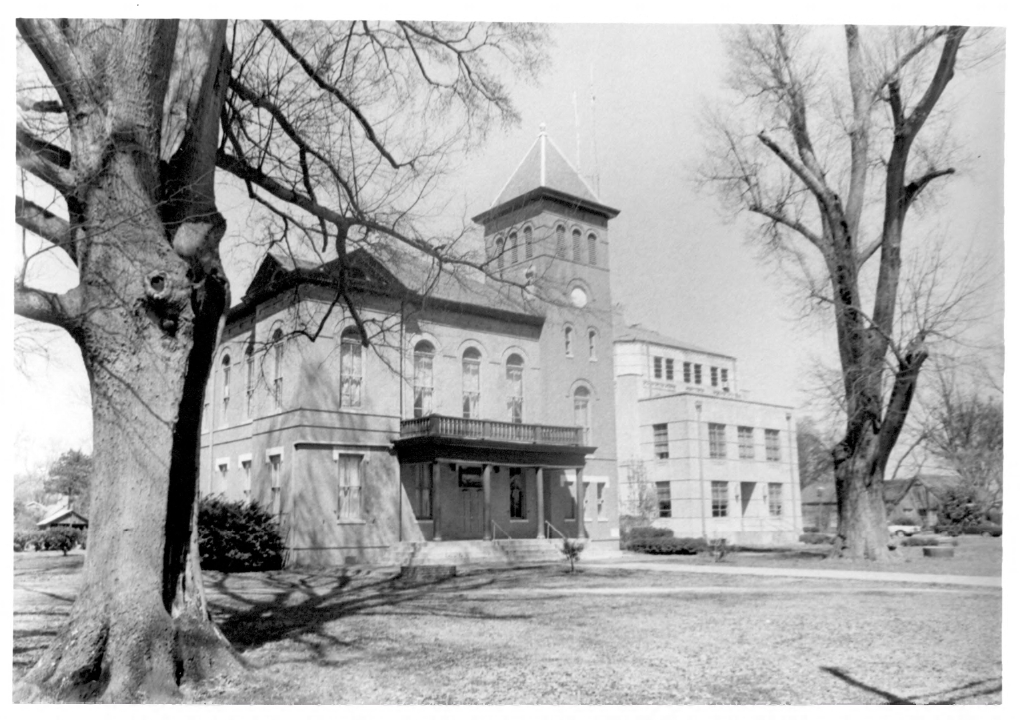
Exterior view of the Old East Carroll Parish Courthouse.

It is a two-acre public square. On the square is the Old East Carroll Parish Courthouse, a two-story building with a three-story side tower with an oculus, built in 1889. The courthouse is the only Romanesque Revival work in the area. Also on the square and included in the district is the new East Carroll Parish Courthouse, built in 1935. It is relatively low, given it is a three-story building.

It was listed along with several other Lake Providence properties and districts that were studied together in the Lake Providence MRA on October 3, 1980.

== See also ==
- National Register of Historic Places listings in East Carroll Parish, Louisiana
- Lake Providence Commercial Historic District
- Lake Providence Residential Historic District
- Arlington Plantation
- Fischer House
- Nelson House
