= Nelson House (Lake Providence, Louisiana) =

Historic house in Louisiana, United States

- U.S. National Register of Historic Places
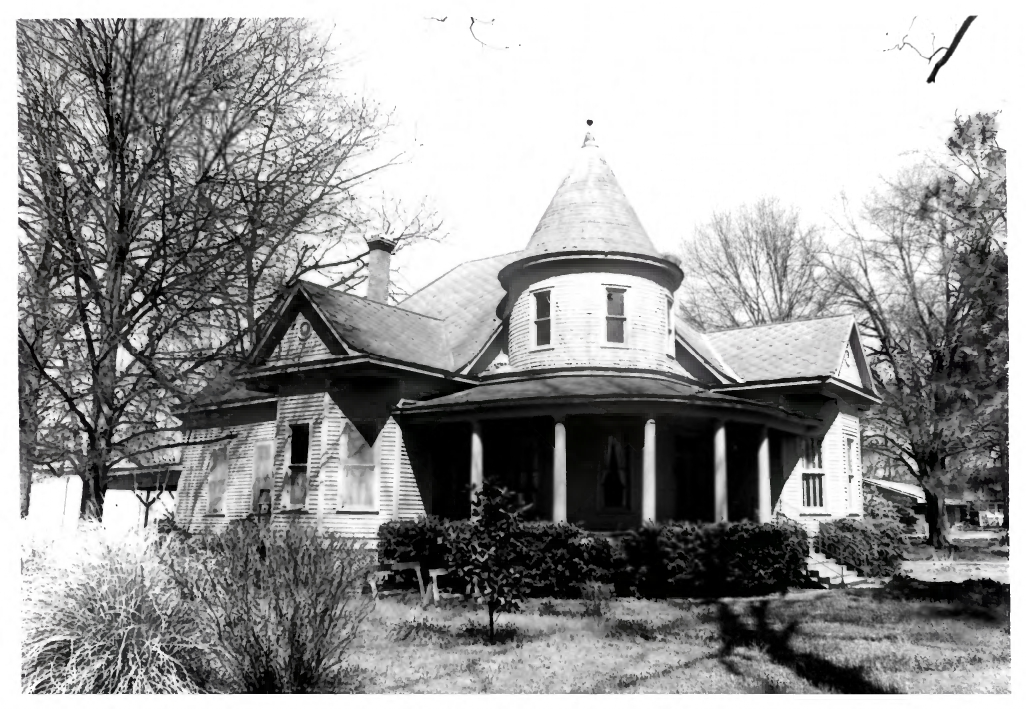

- Location within Louisiana Location within the United States
- Location: 407 Davis Street, Lake Providence, Louisiana
- Coordinates: 32°48′06″N 91°10′30″W
- Area: 1 acre (0.40 ha)
- Built: 1905
- Architectural style: Queen Anne
- MPS: Lake Providence MRA
- NRHP reference No.: 80001727
- Added to NRHP: October 3, 1980

The Nelson House on Davis Street in Lake Providence, Louisiana was a historic mansion listed on the National Register of Historic Places on October 3, 1980.

It was a Queen Anne-style house with a large and prominent turret, as is typical for large Queen Anne style houses elsewhere but which is somewhat rare in Louisiana, where so-called Queen Anne houses are often modest one- or two-story I-houses with some Queen Anne details. It has an L-shaped plan. It has two semi-octagonal bays in addition to the corner turret, and it has a Colonial Revival-style curving gallery.

A garage to the rear of the house was added in the 1940s.

It was listed along with several other Lake Providence properties and districts that were studied together in the Lake Providence MRA on October 3, 1980.

The house is no longer standing. It disappeared some time between 1980 and 1996. (Note: Check historic satellite imageries. House is not standing in 1996 and must have been in 1980 when NRHP listing was made.)

== See also ==
- National Register of Historic Places listings in East Carroll Parish, Louisiana
- Lake Providence Commercial Historic District
- Lake Providence Residential Historic District
- Arlington Plantation
- Fischer House
- Old Courthouse Square
