= Buckmeadow Plantation House =

Historic house in Louisiana, United States

- Formerly listed on the U.S. National Register of Historic Places
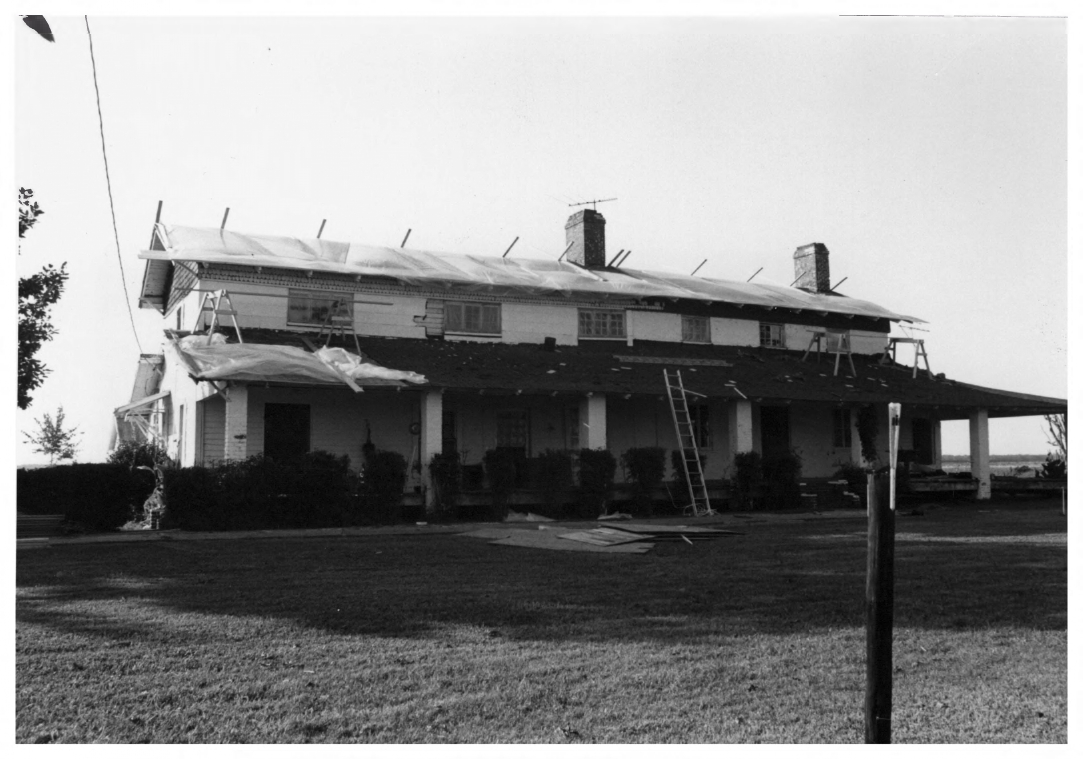

- Location within Louisiana Location within the United States
- Location: Along LA 2, about 1 mile (1.6 km) west of its junction with US 65
- Nearest city: Lake Providence, Louisiana
- Coordinates: 32°51′11″N 91°14′21″W
- Area: 0.3 acres (0.12 ha)
- Built: c.1840
- Architectural style: Carolina I-house
- Demolished: Summer 2015
- NRHP reference No.: 83000503

Significant dates
- Added to NRHP: September 15, 1983
- Removed from NRHP: December 28, 2015

Buckmeadow Plantation House was a historic plantation house located along LA 2, about 5 miles (8.0 km) northwest of Lake Providence, Louisiana. It was built in 1840 and added to the National Register of Historic Places on September 15, 1983.

It was a "large, rambling, brick and frame, Carolina I house which was built in three stages between about 1840 and 1930." It was built in about 1840 with two rooms on each floor and a one-story front gallery around sides and front. When listed the house retained wooden Greek Revival mantels and square brick gallery posts from this era. It was expanded by addition of a second frame I-house and otherwise modified in the late 1800s. It was renovated again in the 1930s.

The house was removed from the National Register on December 28, 2015, after the land owner demolished the whole area, over the summer of 2015.

== See also ==
- List of plantations in Louisiana
- National Register of Historic Places listings in East Carroll Parish, Louisiana
