= Byerley House =

Historic house in Louisiana, United States

- U.S. National Register of Historic Places
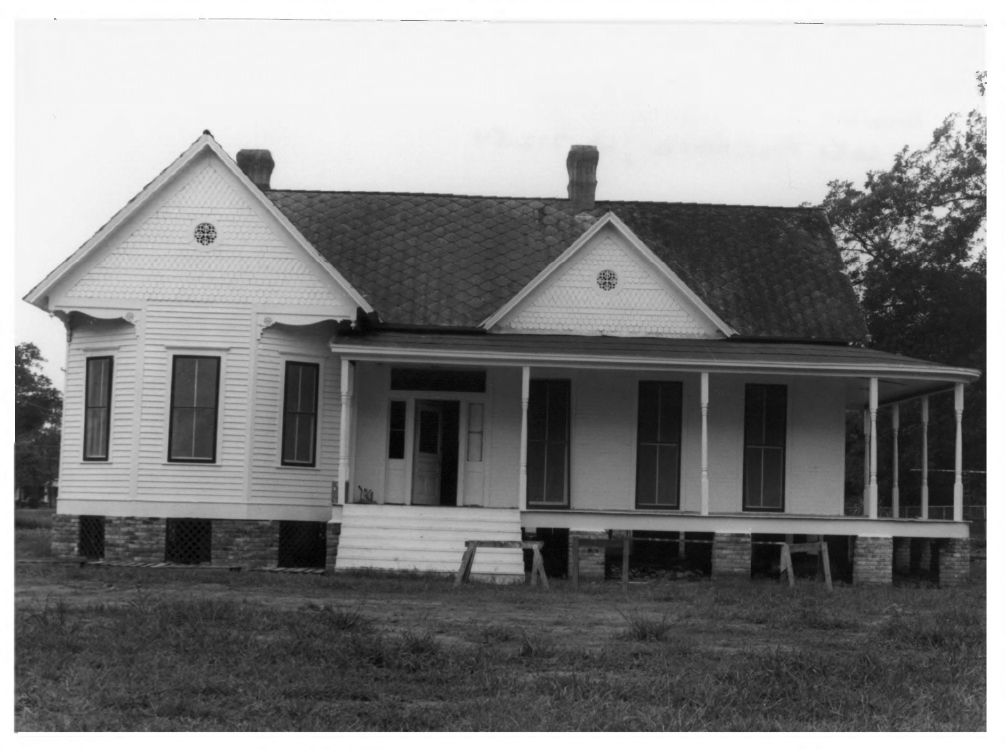

- Location within Louisiana Location within the United States
- Location: 600 Lake Street, Lake Providence, Louisiana
- Coordinates: 32°48′23″N 91°10′30″W
- Area: 1 acre (0.40 ha)
- Built: c.1902
- Architectural style: Stick-Eastlake, Queen Anne Revival
- NRHP reference No.: 91001681
- Added to NRHP: November 13, 1991

Byerley House, located at the corner of Lake Street and Ingram Street in Lake Providence in East Carroll Parish, Louisiana, is a one-story house built in c.1902.

The house has Queen Anne styling including asymmetrical massing, textured surfaces, a wraparound gallery, and a hexagonal bay as well as a rectangular bay. The textured surfaces include "beaded board siding on the facade and gable peaks combining fishscale, diamond, and crescent shaped shingles." Although perhaps modest relative to two-story Queen Anne houses with turrets and other features elsewhere, it was deemed significant in its NRHP nomination to be "an intact and extremely rare example of the Queen Anne Revival style within Lake Providence". The house also has Stick-Eastlake details including "turned gallery columns and circular grilled vents piercing each of the building's [five] major gables."

The house was moved one block's distance in 1991 to save it from demolition, but as before it stands on a large corner lot which is the site of the King House enlisted in the Lake Providence Residential Historic District and burned down some time after its listing. It is located near the southeastern shore of an oxbow lake and across the street from Grace Episcopal Church.

The house was listed on the National Register of Historic Places on November 13, 1991.

== See also ==
- National Register of Historic Places listings in East Carroll Parish, Louisiana
