= VM Software =

1980s software company

- Industry: Software
- Founded: 1981

VM Software, Inc.. was a software company whose product line focused on mainframes running IBM's VM/CMS operating system.

== History ==
VM Software was formed under that name in 1981. They had 11 products named VMxxxxx, with features that complemented the systems-oriented capabilities that IBM's software provided. With the 1987 arrival of IBM's 9370 mid-range mainframe, VM added VMCenter II to its product line.

VM Software renamed itself to Systems Center, Inc., sometime around 1989. In 1993, it was acquired by Sterling Software, itself acquired by Computer Associates in 2000. VM Software's mailing address, under Systems Center and Sterling remained 1800 Alexander Bell Drive but addressed as "VM Software Division".

== Product summary ==
Among their offerings were:

- VMAccount - facilitating chargeback
- VMArchive - facilitated queue-based user-initiated saving and restoring of individual or groups of files
- VMBackup - intended for doing full system saves, but permitting user-initiated queued file restores.
- VMBatch - more features than IBM's CMSBATCH

== See also ==
- Connect:Direct
