= National Register of Historic Places listings in East Carroll Parish, Louisiana =

Location of East Carroll Parish in Louisiana

This is a list of the National Register of Historic Places listings in East Carroll Parish, Louisiana.

This is intended to be a complete list of the properties on the National Register of Historic Places in East Carroll Parish, Louisiana, United States. The locations of National Register properties for which the latitude and longitude coordinates are included below, may be seen in a map.

There are 8 properties listed on the National Register in the parish. One property was once listed, but has since been removed.

This National Park Service list is complete through NPS recent listings posted December 12, 2025.

== Current listings ==
	Name on the Register	Image	Date listed	Location	City or town	Description
1	Arlington Plantation	Arlington Plantation	October 3, 1980 (#80004476)	Along Schneider Lane, about 0.81 miles (1.30 km) north of Lake Providence; 32°48′54″N 91°10′35″W	Lake Providence	Part (resource #3) of Lake Providence MRA.
2	Byerley House	Byerley House	November 13, 1991 (#91001681)	600 Lake Street; 32°48′23″N 91°10′30″W	Lake Providence	
3	First National Bank		November 4, 2024 (#100010960)	216 Lake Street; 32°48′17″N 91°10′15″W	Lake Providence	
4	Fischer House	Fischer House	January 11, 1980 (#80001726)	Harding Street; 32°48′38″N 91°11′10″W	Lake Providence	Also part (resource #4) of Lake Providence MRA.
5	Lake Providence Commercial Historic District	Lake Providence Commercial Historic District	December 6, 1979 (#79001063)	Lake Street, Levee Street, and Scarborough Street; 32°48′17″N 91°10′14″W	Lake Providence	Old and new courthouses on Courthouse Square, and numerous commercial buildings. Also part (resource #1) of Lake Providence MRA.
6	Lake Providence Residential Historic District	Lake Providence Residential Historic District	October 3, 1980 (#80004477)	Lake Street and Davis Street; 32°48′27″N 91°10′35″W	Lake Providence	Part (resource #2) of Lake Providence MRA.
7	Nelson House	Nelson House	October 3, 1980 (#80001727)	407 Davis St. 32°48′06″N 91°10′30″W	Lake Providence	Part (resource #5) of Lake Providence MRA. No more standing.
8	Old Courthouse Square	Old Courthouse Square	October 3, 1980 (#80001728)	Bounded by 1st Street, Hood Street, 2nd Street and Davis Street; 32°48′13″N 91°10′24″W	Lake Providence	Part (resource #6) of Lake Providence MRA.

== Former listing ==
	Name on the Register	Image	Date listed	Date removed	Location	City or town	Description
1	Buckmeadow Plantation House	Buckmeadow Plantation House	September 15, 1983 (#83000503)	December 28, 2015	Along LA 2, about 1 mile (1.6 km) west of its junction with US 65; 32°51′11″N 91°14′21″W	Lake Providence vicinity	Delisted on December 28, 2015 as the land owner demolished the whole area over the summer of 2015.

== See also ==
- List of National Historic Landmarks in Louisiana
- National Register of Historic Places listings in Louisiana
