= Lake Providence Residential Historic District =

Historic district in Louisiana, United States

- U.S. National Register of Historic Places
- U.S. Historic district
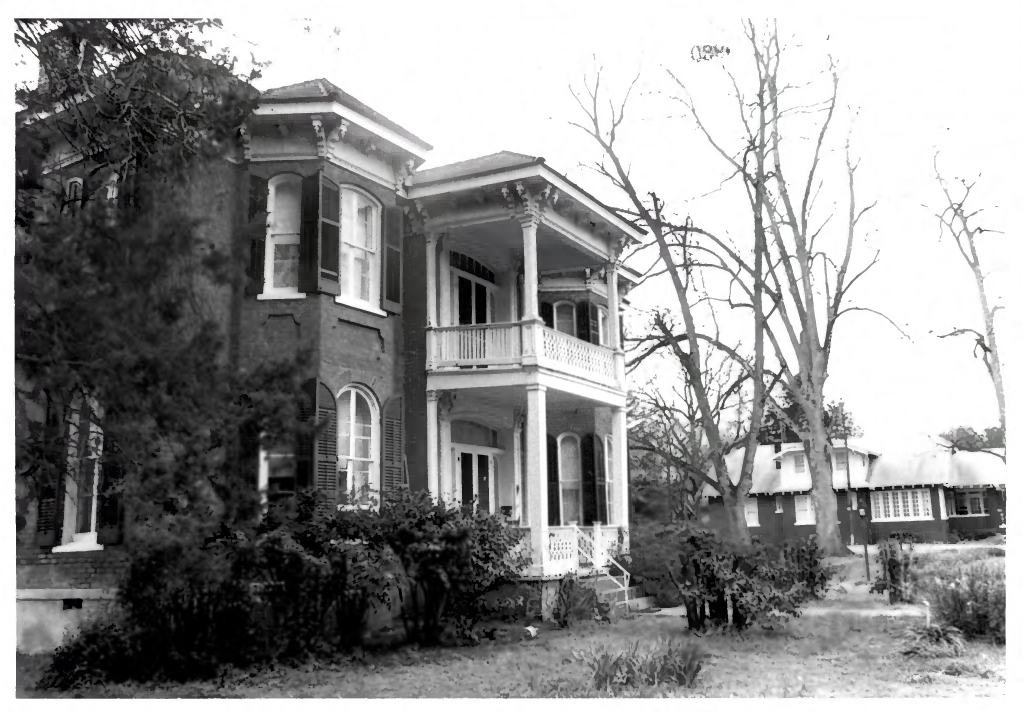

- Location within Louisiana Location within the United States
- Location: Lake Street and Davis Street, Lake Providence, Louisiana
- Coordinates: 32°48′27″N 91°10′35″W
- Area: 13 acres (5.3 ha)
- Architectural style: Bungalow/craftsman, Late Victorian, Federal
- MPS: Lake Providence MRA
- NRHP reference No.: 80004477
- Added to NRHP: October 3, 1980

The Lake Providence Residential Historic District is a 13 acres (5.3 ha) historic district in Lake Providence in East Carroll Parish, Louisiana which was listed on the National Register of Historic Places on October 3, 1980.

The listing included 14 "large and pretentious" residences, 11 regarded as contributing buildings and three regarded as intrusions, in a continuous group all on Lake Street, facing across to the shoreline of Lake Providence, except a few on Davis Street, perpendicular.

The district was listed along with several other Lake Providence properties and districts that were studied together in the Lake Providence MRA on October 3, 1980.

== Contributing Properties ==
The historical district contains a total of 11 contributing properties, built between c.1840 and c.1926. Four of the properties are no more standing:

- Delony House (c.1840), 32°48′28″N 91°10′43″W, one of only two pedimented Greek Revival houses in East Carroll Parish. It is a five bay central hall plan house which reportedly was moved to its current location in the 1870s.
- Walsworth House (c. 1925), 32°48′28″N 91°10′42″W, one of two largest bungalow-style houses in the parish. At the time of NRHP nomination, its porch had "recently been sensitively enclosed with darkened glass."
- Voelker House (c.1905), 32°48′27″N 91°10′39″W, believed to be the largest Queen Anne-style houses in the area, with three semi-octagonal bays, a "completely circumscribed porch" and a port cochere. The house is no more existing, and has disappeared some time between 1998 and 2003.
- Holt House (c.1880), 32°48′25″N 91°10′36″W, a late Greek Revival-style one-story central hall plan house.
- Minsky House (c.1925), 32°48′25″N 91°10′35″W, the other large bungalow.
- Bass House (c.1875), 32°48′24″N 91°10′33″W, a two-story brick central hall plan house which "is probably the only extant fully developed example of the Italian villa style in the region."
- King House (c.1905), 32°48′23″N 91°10′30″W, with a rare double turret design and a double curving porch. The house is no more existing, and has disappeared some time between 1980 and 1991. Its corner lot is now occupied by Byerley House which was moved there to avoid demolition.
- Grace Episcopal Church (c.1926), 32°48′22″N 91°10′28″W, a "vaguely Romanesque" two-story church with roundhead windows and a side tower.
- Hamley House (c.1840), 32°48′21″N 91°10′25″W, the other pedimented Greek Revival house. It has a "handsome pedimented portico with its open work columns [which] dates from the 1870s." The house is no more existing and has disappeared some time between 1980 and 1996.
- Parra House (c.1905), 32°48′19″N 91°10′25″W, a boxlike Queen Anne Revival residence somewhat distinguished by its Eastlake-style porch, "more or less typical of middle class residences found in eastern cities at the turn of the century, but untypical of rural northeastern Louisiana."
- Brandenburg House (c.1905), 32°48′18″N 91°10′26″W, another boxlike Queen Anne Revival residence with an Eastlake-style porch. The house is no more existing and has disappeared some time between 1980 and 1996.

== See also ==
- National Register of Historic Places listings in East Carroll Parish, Louisiana
- Lake Providence Commercial Historic District
- Arlington Plantation
- Fischer House
- Nelson House
- Old Courthouse Square
