= Interlink =

Interlink may refer to:

- Hyperlinks
- Interlink Electronics
- Interlink (interbank network)
- Interlink Airlines
- Interlink Publishing
- B-Train road trains in southern Africa
- Interlink (skywalk), an elevated skywalk in T. F. Green Airport station
- Interlink Computer Sciences
- Interlink, former trading name for a European parcel company, now owned by DPDgroup
- INTERLNK, a DOS application
