= Edward Sparrow =

American politician

Confederate States Senator from Louisiana
- In office February 18, 1862 – March 18, 1865
- Preceded by: New constituency
- Succeeded by: Constituency abolished

Deputy from Louisiana to the Provisional Congress of the Confederate States
- In office February 4, 1861 – February 17, 1862
- Preceded by: New constituency
- Succeeded by: Constituency abolished

Personal details
- Born: December 29, 1810 Dublin, Ireland
- Died: July 4, 1882 (aged 71) Lake Providence, Louisiana
- Resting place: Arlington Plantation, Lake Providence, Louisiana
- Party: Democratic
- Education: Kenyon College

Edward Sparrow (December 29, 1810 – July 4, 1882) was an American politician who served as a Confederate States Senator from Louisiana from 1862 to 1865.

== Biography ==
Sparrow was born in Dublin, Ireland. He married Minerva Parker of Natchez, served as sheriff of Concordia Parish, Louisiana, and during the Mexican War he raised a company of soldiers. In 1834 he began making land purchases from the federal government very near the Mississippi River across from Natchez with Edward Whittelsey. He represented Louisiana in the Provisional Congress of the Confederate States from 1861 to 1862. Sparrow was educated at Kenyon College and trained in the law, being admitted to the Ohio bar. He was a Senator from Louisiana in both the First and the Second Confederate States congresses, serving from 1862 to 1865. He was one of just eight men to be members of the Confederate Congress from its beginning to its end. For the entire war he was chairman of the Committee on Military Affairs.

He was the wealthiest man in the Confederate Government and one of the wealthiest in the entire South. The 1860 Census cites his wealth at $1.2 million, which would be comparable to being a billionaire today. In the 1860 census he is listed as having four land holdings, one in Concordia Parish, Louisiana and three in East Carroll Parish, Louisiana, including the Arlington Plantation in Lake Providence, Louisiana. Even in 1880, after the war, East Carroll Parish was the most productive cotton-growing parish or county in the nation. He owned the Arlington Plantation from the 1850s until his death, and is buried in the family cemetery there.

Political offices
New constituency	Deputy from Louisiana to the Provisional Congress of the Confederate States; 1861–1862	Constituency abolished
Confederate States Senate
New constituency	Confederate States Senator (Class 3) from Louisiana; 1862–1865; Served alongside: Thomas Semmes	Constituency abolished
