= Providence Historic District =

Providence Historic District may refer to:

- Lake Providence Historic District, Lake Providence, Louisiana
- Providence Historic District (Providence, Ohio)
- Downtown Providence Historic District, Providence, Rhode Island
- Downtown Providence Historic District (Boundary Increase), Providence, Rhode Island
- Providence Historic District (Providence, Utah)
