= Lake Providence Commercial Historic District =

Historic district in Louisiana, United States

- Lake Providence Historic District
- U.S. National Register of Historic Places
- U.S. Historic district
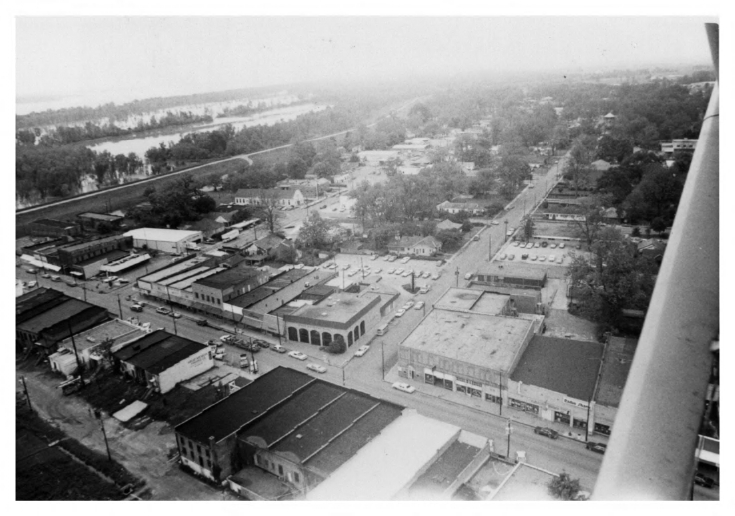
- Aerial view of the Lake Providence Commercial Historic District in Spring 1979

- Location within Louisiana Location within the United States
- Location: Lake Street, Riverside Drive, and Scarborough Street, Lake Providence, Louisiana
- Coordinates: 32°48′17″N 91°10′14″W
- Area: 8 acres (3.2 ha)
- Built: 1900
- Architectural style: Early Commercial
- MPS: Lake Providence MRA
- NRHP reference No.: 79001063
- Added to NRHP: December 6, 1979

The Lake Providence Commercial Historic District is a 8 acres (3.2 ha) historic district in Lake Providence, Louisiana which was listed on the National Register of Historic Places on December 6, 1979.

The chosen district name was initially Lake Providence Historic District. The district was added "Commercial" after being included in the Lake Providence MRA on October 3, 1980, in order to distinguish it from the newly created Lake Providence Residential Historic District.

The district included 33 contributing buildings which, except for three gaps, enclosed Lake Street. They were late 19th and early 20th century brick commercial buildings, mostly just one story in height.

The district included the "old" courthouse and the "new" courthouse in Lake Providence, both on Courthouse Square.

Most of the building seem to have disappeared after the listing. Of the original 33 contributing properties, only 11 are still standing, with several being in very bad condition. (Note: Compare modern satellite imagery and Street View of the area with photographs and maps present in NRHP form.)

== See also ==
- National Register of Historic Places listings in East Carroll Parish, Louisiana
- Lake Providence Residential Historic District
- Arlington Plantation
- Fischer House
- Nelson House
- Old Courthouse Square
