= Connect:Direct =

Mainframe computer file transfer software

Connect:Direct—originally named Network Data Mover (NDM)—is a computer software product that transfers files between mainframe computers and/or midrange computers. It was developed for mainframes, with other platforms being added as the product grew. NDM was renamed to Connect:Direct in 1993, following the acquisition of Systems Center, Inc. by Sterling Software. In 1996, Sterling Software executed a public spinoff of a new entity called Sterling Commerce, which consisted of the Communications Software Group (the business unit responsible for marketing the Connect:Direct product and other file transfer products sourced from the pre-1993 Sterling Software (e.g. Connect:Mailbox)) and the Sterling EDI Network business. In 2000, SBC Communications acquired Sterling Commerce and held it until 2010. AT&T merged with SBC effective November 2005. In 2010, IBM completed the purchase of Sterling Commerce from AT&T.

== Technology ==
Traditionally, Sterling Connect:Direct used IBM's Systems Network Architecture (SNA) via dedicated private lines between the parties involved to transfer the data. In the early 1990s TCP/IP support was added. Connect:Direct's primary advantage over FTP was that it made file transfers routine and reliable.

IBM Sterling Connect:Direct is used within the financial services industry, government agencies and other large organizations that have multiple computing platforms: mainframes, midrange, Linux or Windows systems. In terms of speed, Connect:Direct typically performs slightly faster than FTP, reaching the maximum that the interconnecting link can support. If CPU cycles are available, Connect:Direct has several compression modes that can greatly enhance the throughput of the transfer, but care must be exercised in multi-processing environments as Connect:Direct can consume large amounts of processing cycles, impacting other workloads.

Connect:Direct originally did not support encrypted and secure data transfers, however an add-on, Connect:Direct Secure+, provided such support. Encryption can be accomplished with Transport Layer Security using SSL, TLS or the Station-to-Station protocol (STS). Since being acquired by IBM, the add-on has been folded into the base product, so it always supports the latest encryption and security standards.

Connect:Direct file transfers can be done in two formats: Binary mode (where no translation occurs) or in a mode where translation is used to convert an ASCII file to EBCDIC as it is moved to a mainframe or vice versa. These conversions are handled automatically based on the local systems, which is a significant concern with other file transfer software when moving between distributed and mainframe systems.

== History ==
In the mid-1980s, several employees of UCC (University Computing Company subsequently renamed to Uccel Corporation) left to form "The System Center, Inc." in Dallas, Texas. The new company was going to develop a mainframe systems management tool. While researching the requirements of this new software package, it became clear that a more marketable tool would be a high-speed file transfer product. Thus Network Data Mover ("NDM") was created. Originally developed to support high speed file transfer between mainframes using IBM's MVS operating system, later support was added for IBM's DOS/VSE (mainframe DOS, not PC) and VM/CMS operating systems. Recognizing the need to span the diversity of hardware environments, midrange and finally PC support were added.

The System Center merged with VM Software of Reston, Virginia to form "Systems Center, Inc.", with the new headquarters in Reston. The combined company was later purchased by Sterling Software of Dallas in 1993. The headquarters then moved back to Dallas. In 1996 the company was split back into two separate divisions, NDM and VM. The two new companies were called Sterling Commerce (the file transfer group) and Sterling Software (all the application software).

Sterling Software had its own file transfer product, Synctrac, which was merged with the NDM division to create a single file transfer centric entity.

In February 2000, Sam Wyly and Sterling Williams sold Sterling Commerce to SBC Communications (now AT&T) for $3.9 billion. At more or less the same time, the other half of Sterling was sold to Computer Associates International for another $4 billion.

IBM announced the closing of its acquisition of Sterling Commerce on August 27, 2010 for approximately $1.4 billion.
