= Sam Wyly =

American businessman (born 1934)

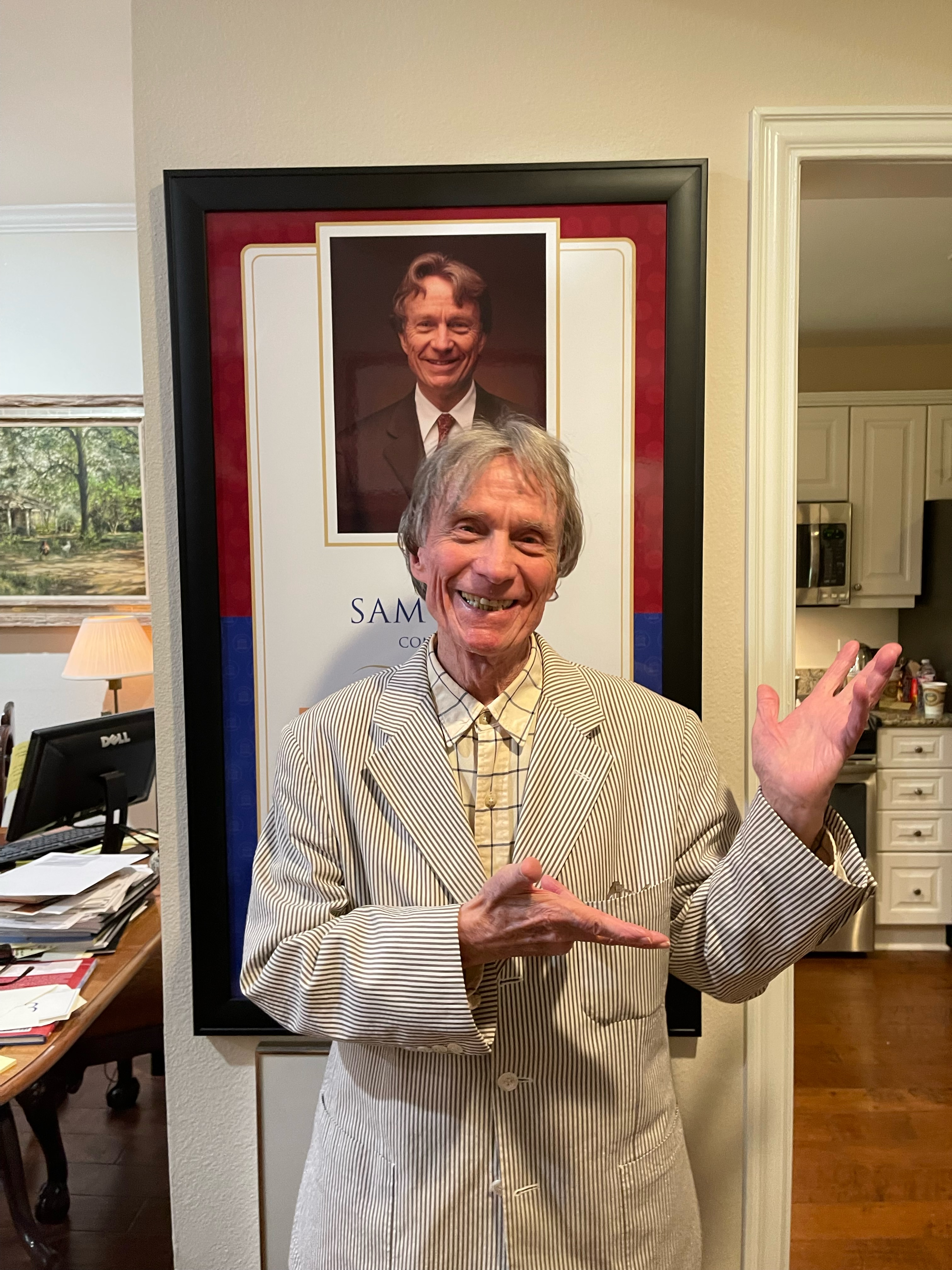
- Sam Wyly in 2022
- Born: Samuel Evans Wyly; October 4, 1934 (age 92); Lake Providence, Louisiana, U.S.
- Education: Louisiana Tech University; University of Michigan, MBA
- Occupations: Businessman, philanthropist, author
- Political party: Republican
- Spouses: Rosemary Wyly (m. 1960–1976) Victoria Steele Wyly (m. 1978, divorced) Cheryl Wyly (m. 1994, divorced)
- Children: 6
- Parent(s): Charles Sr. and Flora Wyly
- Relatives: Charles Wyly (brother); Kimbal Musk (son-in-law)

Samuel Evans Wyly (born October 4, 1934) is an American businessman. He first appeared on Forbes's list of richest Americans in 2000 with a net worth of $750 million, and he remained on that list throughout 2010 with a net worth of $1 billion. His initial wealth was acquired following the public offering of University Computing Company.

Wyly's recent wealth stems from ownership stakes from Sterling Software and Michael's, an American art supply store. In 2010 following a series of investigations, Wyly was charged with federal tax fraud by the SEC and IRS. Following his settlement with federal authorities, he declared bankruptcy in 2014.

== Early life and education ==
Sam Wyly was born in 1934, to parents Flora and Charles Wyly Sr. of Lake Providence, Louisiana. His ancestors included Presbyterian and Episcopalian ministers, college founders, and teachers. Wyly's paternal grandfather was a lawyer who managed plantation assets and helped poor Black convicts get paroled from Angola Prison. His maternal grandfather was a doctor.

He began working at an early age, helping his parents publish a weekly newspaper titled The Delhi Dispatch in Richland Parish. He sold advertising, wrote stories, sent telegrams for oil and gas workers, folded and addressed the finished papers, delivered daily newspapers from the bus stop on Highway 80, and cleaned the printing presses. He spent his summers working in the Delhi Oil field.

Wyly attended Delhi High School, graduating in 1952. During his senior year, he served as student body president. He played nose guard on his high school football team.

Wyly attended Louisiana Tech University where he studied journalism and accounting. During this time he sold class rings. Wyly was elected class president and student senate president.

Wyly earned a Master of Business Administration at the University of Michigan in Ann Arbor in 1957, where he chose the nickname "Sam".

== Business career ==
After Michigan, Wyly went to Air Force Boot Camp in San Antonio and to Dallas for a job with IBM. He and Ross Perot were classmates at IBM's education center. Three and a half years later, Wyly left IBM for Honeywell, establishing their computer business in Dallas, Fort Worth, and Oklahoma. When Honeywell rejected his plan for a new technology computing center to replace the obsolete Univac at Southern Methodist University, he quit. In 1963 Wyly founded University Computing Company (UCC), to serve engineers, scientists, and researchers. He capitalized the company with $1,000 and commitments from customers including Sun Oil Company, Texas Instruments and SMU, as well as $650,000 borrowed from the First National Bank in Dallas. The company went public in September 1965, the month his twin daughters, Laurie and Lisa, were born. In four years, UCC stock gained 100–1 over its IPO price. Many employees and early investors became millionaires. By 1969, it was one of only five companies headquartered in Texas with a market capitalization of $1 billion or more.

In 1967 he bought the ten-store restaurant chain Bonanza Steakhouse which served steak and potatoes and salad for $2. Wyly ran TV ads using the actors who played "Hoss", "Little Joe" and "Pa Cartwright" from the TV series Bonanza. Bonanza grew from 10 to 600 restaurants^{[3]} when he sold it to John Kluge.

In 1968 he acquired Gulf Insurance to help fund his ambition of a nationwide digital network to compete with AT&T, then the national telephone monopoly. Gene Bylinsky of Fortune wrote, "Sam Wyly builds a telephone company for computers." In his 1968 keynote speech to the Spring Joint Computer Conference in Atlantic City, Wyly said, "The computer user has dialed into a busy signal.". Also in 1968 he co-founded Earth Resources Company, an oil-refining and silver-mining company, that built a refinery in North Pole, Alaska to make jet fuel for airplanes flying to Asia over the Arctic Sea for overnight air mail delivery.

- Late 1960s and early 1970s: a trustee of SMU and director of First National Bank.
- 1972: Built a computer keyboard plant to create jobs for Arapaho and Shoshone workers on the Wind River Indian Reservation in Wyoming.
- 1973: He divided UCC into four companies, including Datran, which began construction of a US digital network to transmit data among 27 American cities in direct competition with AT&T. He was unable to capitalize Datran at $400 million and Wall Street disappeared for over a decade when there weren't any technology IPOs for 14 years. Venture capital investing shrank 95 percent. Home mortgage rates rose to 20 percent. Wyly liquidated Datran in bankruptcy in 1976 and filed a $300 million anti-trust suit against AT&T for abuse of its monopoly power and predatory pricing. The courts and Congress forced the bust up of the monopoly, citing Datran as a major reason. Unable to afford lawyers' fees, he engaged Texas lawyer Bob Strauss—later Chairman of the Democratic Party—to fight the legal battle for a contingency fee of 28 percent of any winnings. Four years later it was the largest fee ever paid to a Dallas firm. The monopoly was turned into eight companies competing with each other, and they paid a $50 million settlement to Wyly's company. Strauss later became President George H. W. Bush's Ambassador to Russia and AT&T ultimately headquartered in Dallas.
- 1981: Co-founded Sterling Software. Focused on mainframe software and sold in 2000 for $4 billion, and its spin-off of Sterling Commerce sold to AT&T for another $4 billion.
- 1982: Bought ten arts-and-crafts Michaels stores. In July 2006, Bain and Blackstone purchased the company for $6 billion. Wyly's sale protected shareholders from massive losses in the Crash of 2009.
- In 1990, co-founded hedge fund Maverick Capital, which by 2003 had about $8 billion in assets. Beginning in 1993, his son Evan, a Maverick co-founder, and money manager Lee S. Ainslie III managed the fund.
- In 1996, IPOed 19 percent of Sterling Commerce for $288 million in the "dot.com" boom of 1995–2000, paying out the other 81 percent to Sterling Software shareholders as a tax-free dividend. Reference Sterling Software SEC filings.
- In 2002, co-founded Ranger Capital, a fund focused on small-cap stocks.
- As of 2006, Wyly was co-founder with son, Evan, the largest clean-energy producer Green Mountain Energy. replacing electricity made by older, dirty, coal plants with cleaner natural gas, wind, and solar power. Green Mountain became the clean-energy supplier to the Empire State Building in New York.
- In 2006, Wyly was the largest investor in the online social networking company Zaadz.com at an estimated $1.5m.
- In March 2007, Forbes magazine estimated Wyly's net worth to be $1.1 billion. He was on the "Forbes 400" for nine years.

== Books ==
Cheryl and Sam Wyly purchased Explore Booksellers and Bistro in January 2007.

Wyly's memoir, 1,000 Dollars & an Idea, was published in September 2008.

His illustrated biography, Beyond Tallulah, How Sam Wyly Became America's Boldest Big-Time Entrepreneur, by Dennis Hamilton (Melcher Media) was published in 2011. Hamilton began writing about Wyly in software journals in the 1970s.

Wyly and his son Andrew published their book Texas Got It Right! in October 2012. The book claims to explain why California, New York, and the Rust Belt states are losing jobs to Texas and the Southern and Rocky Mountain states.

His book The Immigrant Spirit: How Newcomers Enrich America was published in 2016, and his last book in May 2018 was Dallas Got It Right!, co-authored with Laurie Matthews and Andrew Wyly.

== Political involvement ==
Wyly has been an active donor to the Republican Party since Richard Nixon's 1968 presidential campaign.

In 1968, Wyly was a delegate to the Republican Convention at the request of Chuck Percy, an Illinois Senator and former CEO who he met at a "Young Presidents'" event. After Percy lost the nomination, Wyly became chairman for the "Nixon For President" campaign in Texas. Wyly and other Texan businessmen heavily invested in Richard Nixon's presidential campaign.

Sam Wyly served as chairman of a presidential advisory commission under Presidents Nixon and Ford.

The 1992 presidential campaign saw his friends independent Ross Perot and Republican George H. W. Bush both run for president. Both Bush and Perot lost to the Democratic nominee, Bill Clinton who was Governor of Arkansas prior to becoming president.

In 1994 George H.W. Bush's son George W. Bush was elected Governor of Texas. Wyly donated heavily to Bush's campaign and was an early supporter in his presidential aspirations. In 1999, George W. Bush formally intended to run for President of the United States and achieved the Republican nominee. Bush later went on to defeat his opponent Democrat Al Gore in the 2000 presidential election. Wyly and his brother handsomely contributed to Bush's 2000 and 2004 campaign which saw George W. Bush secure two terms. In 2008, Wyly supported GOP nominee Senator John McCain's campaign. McCain ultimately lost the election to fellow US Senator Barack Obama, who was inaugurated in 2009. McCain's defeat spurred many large GOP donors to increase their contributions in the 2010 midterm elections. Wyly was no exception and he also funded GOP races especially in his home state of Texas. This election cycle would be the last Wyly participated in before the SEC's civil litigation.

== Philanthropic activities ==
Wyly and his late brother, Charles, donated more than $160 million to charitable causes between 1986 and 2011.

In 1968, he set up the Sam Wyly Foundation to help black business owners.

With his brother Charles, he funded the 16-story Tower of Learning at Louisiana Tech, designed by the Bastrop architect Hugh G. Parker Jr. They also funded a $10 million gift to build Sam Wyly Hall at the University of Michigan (2000).

Wyly has supported the Salvation Army, Deaf Action Center, Human Rights Organizations, animal shelters in Dallas and Hillsboro, Texas, and Aspen, health care for people surviving with Lou Gehrig's disease, and the Aspen Writers' Foundation. He supported the Dallas Theater Center on Turtle Creek for decades, and was the namesake of the Wyly Theatre in downtown Dallas.

In 2015, Wyly founded WylyBooks Company.

== Legal history ==
=== Federal tax evasion charges and settlement ===
In 1979, Wyly settled Securities and Exchange Commission (SEC) charges that he made undisclosed payments to associates to buy up company bonds as part of a plan to stave off bankruptcy for University Computing after the $100 million Datran loss.

In August 2006, Sam and Charles Wyly were again under investigation by the SEC. A grand jury was convened in both Dallas and in New York, to collect evidence regarding their use of potentially illegal offshore tax shelters. The Wyly brothers were not indicted by either grand jury. In 2006, the Texas Senate investigators allege that the Wyly brothers used the offshore trusts to buy $30 million worth of artwork, jewelry, furniture and other items for their personal use; however, the investigation did not result in criminal prosecution.

==== Securities fraud charges ====
In the past the Wyly brothers have been accused of avoiding their tax obligations by transferring stock options in Michaels and Sterling Software Inc however were never criminally indicted. However, on July 29, 2010, the SEC charged Charles and Sam Wyly with fraud for violating federal securities laws governing ownership and trading of securities by corporate insiders. While the SEC was pursuing Wyly in federal court, New York State launched a civil lawsuit against him for the misuse of offshore trusts. Both counts were dismissed and Wyly was not charged. In 2016, Wyly's case with the SEC, ended when he reached a settlement agreement which ordered him to pay $198.1 million.

==== Federal tax evasion charges ====
The investigation by the SEC attracted the attention of the Internal Revenue Service as it was believed Wyly failed to pay federal taxes on his assets. The IRS opened a formal inquiry that same year and began to pursue Wyly on tax evasion charges. The agency then moved to collect the funds hidden in the offshore trusts that had been registered to Wyly's name. In court, Wyly defended himself by claiming that his accountants were responsible for the assets in the Isle of Man and that he had no knowledge or involvement in where his money was going. Wyly was found guilty and was convicted in June 2016. He was ordered to pay $1.1 billion, which consisted of "$135.5 million of taxes, $402.1 million of interest, and $570.1 million of penalties," to the IRS.

The SEC and IRS prosecutions coupled with the civil lawsuits from New York impacted the financial situation of the Wyly's substantially, and he declared bankruptcy in 2014. Wyly sold his home in Highland Park, Texas, in 2017. Wyly finally settled with the IRS and paid out the necessary penalties in October 2019. Wyly pressed the agency to set aside some of the confiscated assets to be placed in a trust for his children. In 2019 the IRS and Wyly reached an agreement and established a trust.

== Personal life ==
Wyly and his brother Charles, older by a year, were considered close. They both played high school football, attended Louisiana Tech University, and joined Pi Kappa Alpha fraternity together. They worked together in a large number of businesses that they either owned or ran. Charles was killed in a car accident in Aspen's Roaring Fork Valley in 2011.

From 1960 to 1976, Wyly was married to Rosemary Acton. In 1978, he married Victoria L. Steele. Wyly then divorced Victoria and went on to marry a third woman, Cheryl Wyly, from 1994 to 2016.

Wyly has six adult children; Evan, twins Laurie and Lisa, Kelly, Andrew, and Christiana. In April 2018, Wyly's daughter Christiana, an environmental activist, married Kimbal Musk, the younger brother of business magnate Elon Musk. Between 2013 and 2015, Christiana was in a same-sex civil partnership with Skin, lead singer of British rock group Skunk Anansie.
