= Louisiana State Cotton Museum =

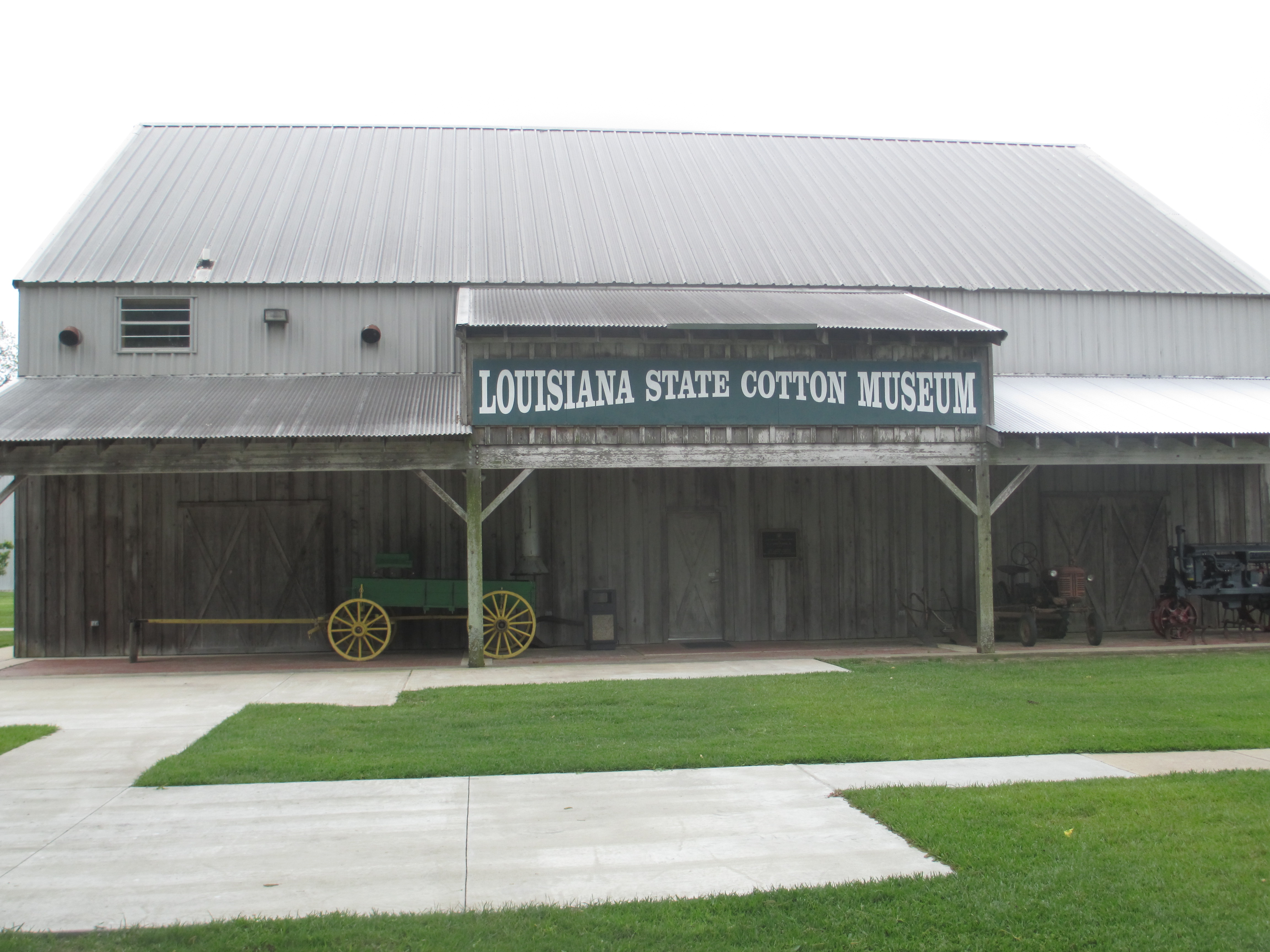
- Location: 7162 Highway 65 North, Lake Providence, Louisiana
- Coordinates: 32°49′6.13″N 91°12′32.91″W
- Website: Louisiana State Cotton Museum, Secretary of State, Louisiana

Louisiana State Cotton Museum is located in Lake Providence, Louisiana. The area has been a center of cotton growing, and the museum exhibits the history and traditions of cotton cultivation and harvest. The main gallery has life-sized dioramas, farming equipment, and a recreated juke joint.

Museum buildings include a farmhouse, commissary, chapel, exhibit hall, and tenant house. Exhibits include the history of cotton, and how it became the country's preeminent cash crop; its role in westward expansion; the state's first electric cotton gin; and musical instruments of the Delta blues.

== Gallery ==
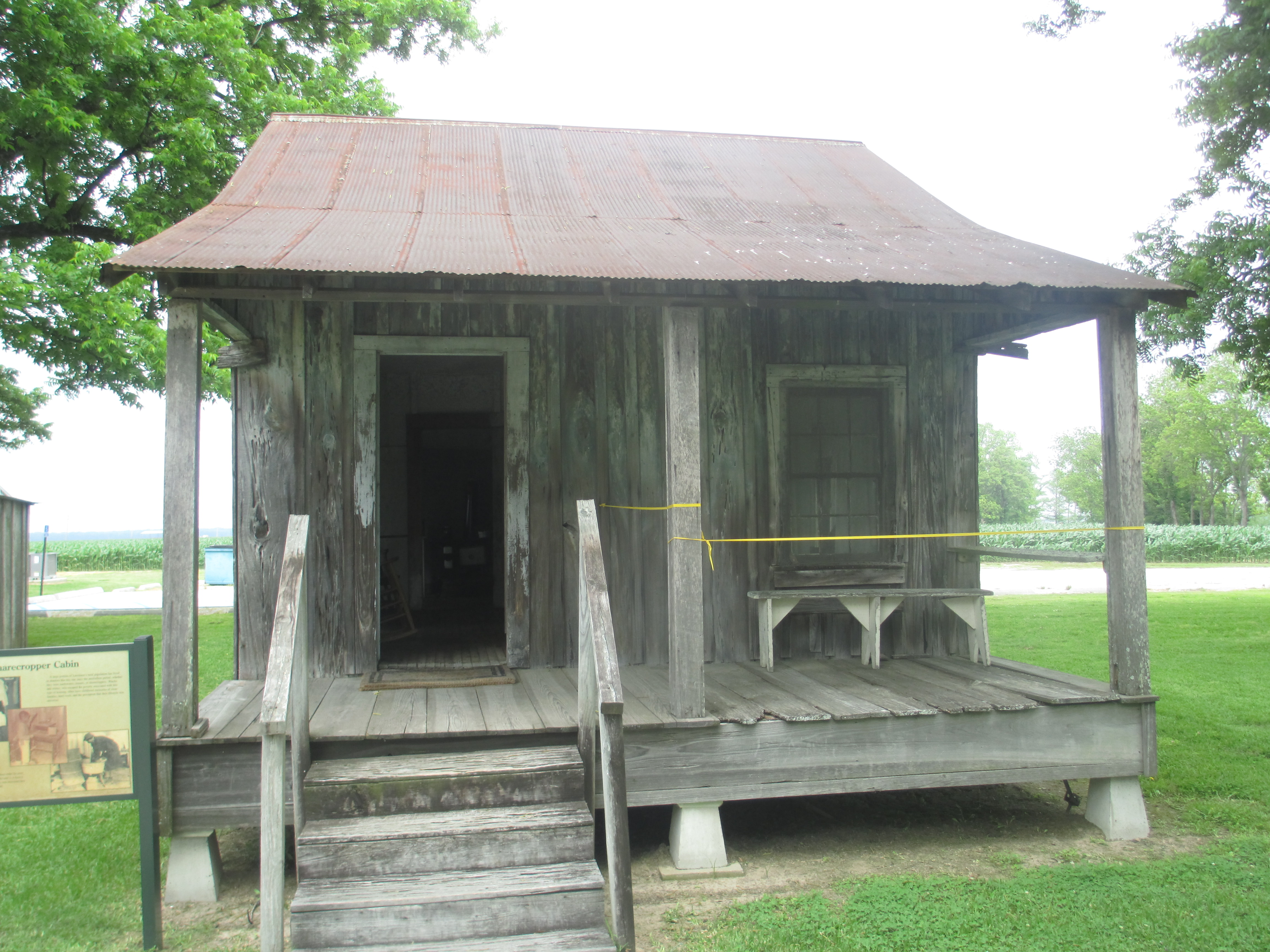
Sharecropper cabin
