= Interlink Computer Sciences =

American network software developer

Interlink Computer Sciences, Inc.
- Type: Network software
- Founded: 1983
- Founder: Lambert Onuma; Fred Wright; Karl Johnson; Greg Thompson
- Headquarters: Fremont, California
- Products: Interlink, TCPaccess

Interlink Computer Sciences, Inc., of Fremont, California, was a developer of hardware and software that allowed IBM mainframe computers running the MVS operating system to be connected to non-IBM networks.

Interlink was founded in 1983 by Lambert Onuma, Fred Wright, Karl Johnson and Greg Thompson, formerly of Digital Equipment Corporation. The company's first product, called simply Interlink, allowed IBM MVS mainframes to be connected to VAX computers on a DECnet network. Later a VM/DECnet product was developed in cooperation with Dupont to link IBM VM/CMS systems with a DECnet network interconnecting e-mail, file, tape, and storage access, terminal emulation, a program-to-program API, and enabling DECnet to be tunneled over an SNA LU6.2 network.

In 1990, Interlink acquired a product called ACCES/MVS from Advanced Computer Communications, which implemented a native TCP/IP protocol stack on the MVS and VM operating systems and within CICS regions. First released in 1986, ACCES/MVS had been the first commercial TCP/IP implementation for MVS mainframes. Interlink developed and marketed this product as SNS/TCPaccess. The prefix was later dropped, and TCPaccess became the company's main focus of development by the mid-1990s.

Meanwhile, in 1989, IBM had introduced its own TCP/IP offering on MVS. This product had been ported from the VM operating system, and required expensive and inefficient protocol conversions. Interlink was able to successfully sell TCPaccess as a more efficient and better-performing alternative, and as late as 1996 it still held 25% of the TCP/IP market on MVS. As the decade progressed, IBM improved its product, and Interlink's market share steadily eroded.

In August 1996, Interlink became a public corporation, with an initial offering of $10 per share on the NASDAQ exchange. In December of that year, a strategic agreement was announced with Cisco Systems to jointly develop and market the TCPaccess product as Cisco IOS for S/390. Shares of Interlink stock jumped to $15 on this news, and ultimately approached $18. Sales of the re-branded Cisco product fell below expectations, and Interlink struggled to rebuild its own sales channel. Interlink stock eventually fell below $4 per share.

In 1998, Interlink introduced e-Control, a new TCP/IP network management product for the mainframe. The company came to the attention of Dallas-based Sterling Software Inc., which had its own product in this space. In March, 1999, Sterling announced it had agreed to acquire Interlink Computer Sciences Inc. for $7 per share. The deal was valued at $64 million. On May 3, 1999, the acquisition was completed.

== TCPaccess ==
TCPaccess is a software product which implements the TCP/IP protocol suite on IBM mainframe computers using the MVS operating system. It was developed in 1986 by Advanced Computer Communications under the name ACCES/MVS, and was the first commercial TCP/IP implementation for MVS mainframes. It is usually associated with Interlink Computer Sciences, which developed and marketed the product from 1990 until 1999. By 1994, Interlink had sold over 2,000 licenses of TCPaccess.

The product was marketed by Cisco Systems as Cisco IOS for S/390. It was offered by Computer Associates as Unicenter TCPaccess Communications Server.
