= Charles Wyly =

American businessman (1933–2011)

Charles Wyly, Jr.
- Born: Charles Joseph Wyly Jr. October 13, 1933; Lake Providence, Louisiana, US
- Died: August 7, 2011 (aged 77); Aspen, Colorado, US
- Education: Louisiana Tech University (BBA)
- Occupations: Businessman; Philanthropist
- Political party: Republican
- Spouse: Caroline "Dee" Wyly
- Children: 4
- Relatives: Sam Wyly (brother)

Charles Wyly, Jr. (October 13, 1933 – August 7, 2011) was an American entrepreneur and businessman, philanthropist, civic leader, and a major contributor to Republican causes and art projects in Dallas, Texas. This included $20 million to build a performing arts center in Dallas. In 2006, Forbes magazine estimated his net worth at $1 billion. His younger brother, Sam Wyly, is nearly equal in wealth; the two brothers were close with their business affairs, and were often referred to as the "Wyly brothers". Together the brothers had donated almost $2.5 million to more than two hundred Republican candidates and committees at the federal level over the past two decades. Wyly was inducted into the Louisiana Tech University Athletic Hall of Fame in 2003; he was a Bulldogs football player.

== Early life and education ==
Born during the Great Depression, Charles Wyly was a child when the collapsed economy forced the surrender of his family's cotton farm in Lake Providence in East Carroll Parish in northeastern Louisiana. He attended Delhi High School in Delhi, Louisiana, graduating in 1951 after staying an extra semester to play halfback as a fifth-year senior and help the football team win a Louisiana state championship. Charles and his younger brother went on to attend Louisiana Tech University in Ruston at the same time and then to work for IBM. Charles played varsity football for four seasons at Louisiana Tech and earned a degree in business administration in 1956.

== Career ==
He helped his brother, Sam, run their startup computer software company, University Computing, and later founded and led several other companies. He also was a former member of the White House Advisory Council for Management Improvement. During their lifetime, the Wyly brothers together gave more than ninety million dollars to a wide range of charities.

== Scandal and controversy ==
In the summer of 2010, the Internal Revenue Service and Securities and Exchange Commission accused Wyly and his brother of using offshore havens to hide more than a half a billion dollars in profits over 13 years of insider stock trading and fraud. The brothers denied the claims and were fighting the allegations.

Charles and Sam Wyly, according to a jury in New York City in 2013 in a civil trial, acted fraudulently by trying to hide assets which they controlled in four public companies that were sold for billions of dollars.

The Manhattan jury returned its guilty verdict against 79-year-old Sam Wyly and the estate of his brother, Charles, whom the Securities and Exchange Commission had accused of earning more than $500 million illegally by using offshore accounts to trade securities.

== Death ==
On Sunday, August 7, 2011, Wyly, who maintained a home in the rural town of Woody Creek in Roaring Fork Valley near Aspen, Colorado, was turning onto a highway near the local airport when his Porsche was hit by a sport utility vehicle, according to the Colorado State Highway Patrol. Wyly died later at Aspen Valley Hospital. Charles Wyly was survived by his wife Caroline “Dee” Wyly, brother Sam, four children, and seven grandchildren. He was interred at Sparkman-Hillcrest Memorial Park Cemetery in North Dallas.
