= Arlington Plantation (Lake Providence, Louisiana) =

- U.S. National Register of Historic Places
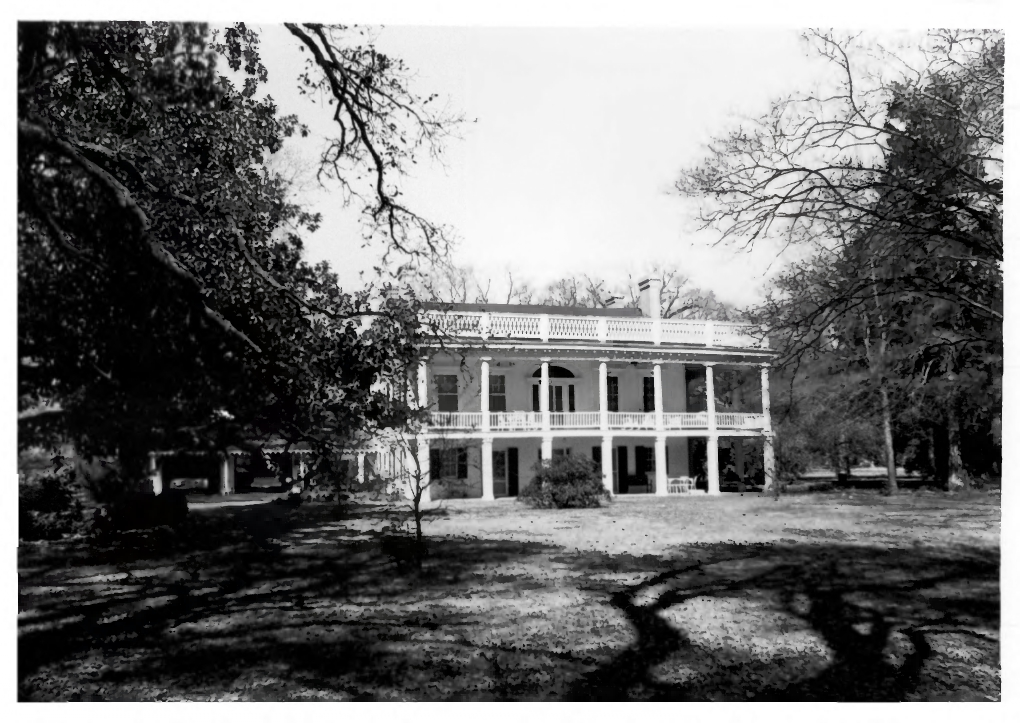
- Arlington Plantation in 1980

- Location within Louisiana Location within the United States
- Location: Along Schneider Lane, about 0.81 miles (1.30 km) north of Lake Providence
- Nearest city: Lake Providence, Louisiana
- Coordinates: 32°48′54″N 91°10′35″W
- Area: 6 acres (2.4 ha)
- Built: 1830
- Architectural style: Greek Revival
- MPS: Lake Providence MRA
- NRHP reference No.: 80004476
- Added to NRHP: October 3, 1980

The Arlington Plantation is a historic plantation located near Lake Providence, Louisiana. It was listed on the National Register of Historic Places on October 3, 1980.

The plantation house has a six-bay two-story Doric gallery, and it overlooks a broad sloping lawn towards Lake Providence. The property includes the house, a twentieth century frame cottage, a gazebo over a cistern, a garage, and a buggy shed. It is significant as one of only about four two-story galleried Greek Revival mansions in northeastern Louisiana, and for its association with Edward Sparrow, "an immensely wealthy cotton planter and Confederate politician".

The mansion was listed on the National Register of Historic Places along with several other Lake Providence properties and districts that were studied together in the Lake Providence MRA on October 3, 1980.

== See also ==
- List of plantations in Louisiana
- National Register of Historic Places listings in East Carroll Parish, Louisiana
- Lake Providence Commercial Historic District
- Lake Providence Residential Historic District
