= Lake Providence, Louisiana =

- Town
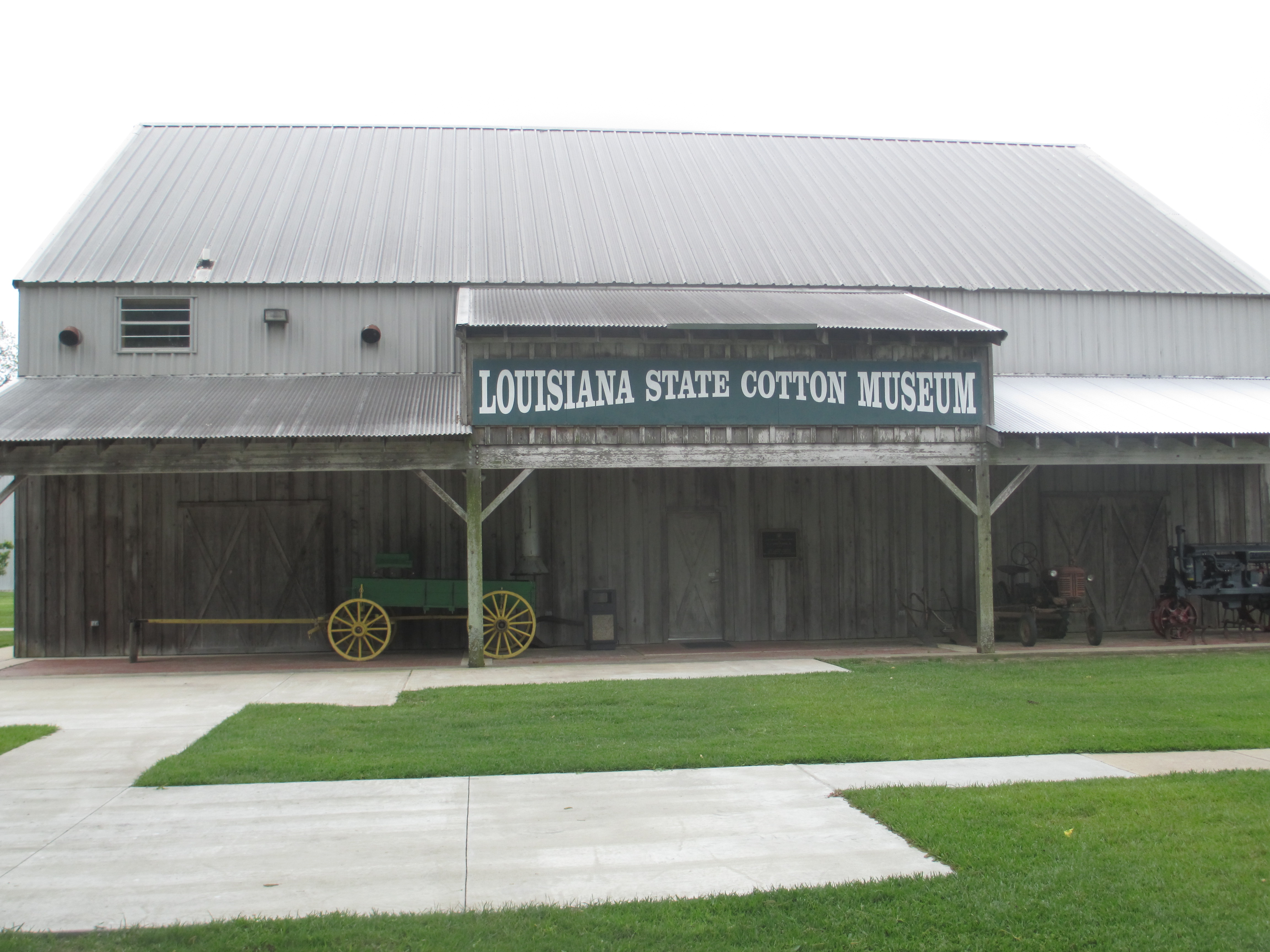
- Louisiana State Cotton Museum in 2013

- Location of Lake Providence in East Carroll Parish, Louisiana.

- Location of Louisiana in the United States
- Coordinates: 32°47′58″N 91°10′29″W
- Country: United States
- State: Louisiana
- Parish: East Carroll

Area
  - Total: 3.61 sq mi (9.36 km^{2})
  - Land: 3.59 sq mi (9.31 km^{2})
  - Water: 0.019 sq mi (0.05 km^{2})
- Elevation: 102 ft (31 m)

Population (2020)
  - Total: 3,587
  - Density: 997.9/sq mi (385.28/km^{2})
- Time zone: UTC-6 (CST)
  - Summer (DST): UTC-5 (CDT)
- ZIP Code: 71254
- Area code: 318
- FIPS code: 22-41400
- GNIS feature ID: 2405976
- Website: Town of Lake Providence

Lake Providence is a town in, and the parish seat of, East Carroll Parish in northeastern Louisiana. As of the 2020 census, Lake Providence had a population of 3,587. The town's poverty rate is approximately 55 percent; the average median household income is $16,500, and the average age is 31.

The town shares its name with the oxbow lake of the Mississippi River, also called Lake Providence. This area was historically developed as cotton plantations before and after the Civil War, and remains largely rural. The Union Army developed a supply depot near the lake during the Civil War, and its camp was crowded with refugee slaves seeking their freedom. The town grew larger at this site.

== History ==
In the late 18th century goods such as animal pelts, indigo, and cotton were transported on the Mississippi River by people commonly known as longboat men, named for the type of craft that carried the goods. These were eventually replaced by steamboats. Thieves and pirates raided the longboats, killing the crew and selling the goods. Bunch's Bend is named for a pirate who would raid the boats at this place, where they had to maneuver the bend in the river. If the longboat men made it past Bunch's Bend without being robbed, they would say they, "made it to Providence."

The trading town of Providence developed at the bend. It later was renamed as Lake Providence when the town was moved to its current location surrounding a natural oxbow lake. The Lake Providence area first opened for European-American settlement in the late 1830s, after the federal government enforced Indian Removal to Indian Territory further west of the Mississippi River, and extinguished their land titles. Settlers drained the cypress swamps along the Mississippi River and used enslaved African Americans to clear the land for cultivation.

=== Civil War ===
By the start of the American Civil War in 1861, the region consisted mostly of large cotton plantations along the river, which were worked by thousands of slave laborers.

The town of Lake Providence developed after the arrival of the Union Army in the spring of 1862. Under the direction of General Ulysses S. Grant, the area by Lake Providence was established as a supply depot and base of operations for the Vicksburg Campaign. The soldiers dug a canal between the Mississippi River and Lake Providence. The area was called "Soldiers' Rest". Grant subsequently moved his troops south for temporary residence at Winter Quarters south of Newellton in Tensas Parish. As slaves crowded into the camp at Lake Providence to gain freedom from surrounding plantations, the population quickly soared from a few hundred to several thousand. What began as a simple military supply camp quickly transformed into a city with a large population of African-American refugees.

By the time Vicksburg, Mississippi fell to the Union in 1863, most planters in the Lake Providence area had fled, and their plantations lay empty. The Union Army determined that they should be productive again.

=== 20th century ===
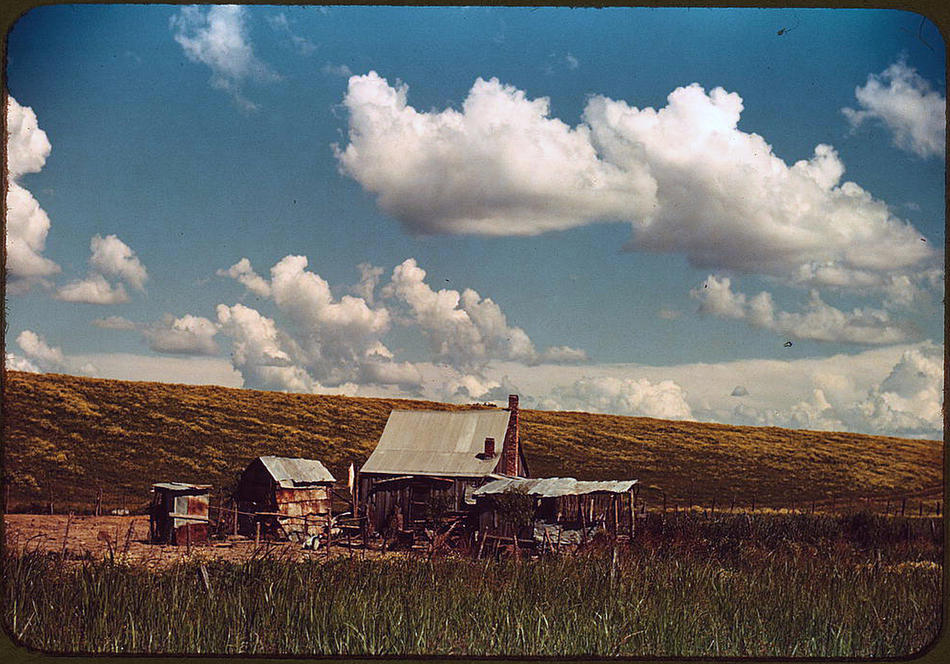
Residence of African-American tenant farmer beside the Mississippi River levee near Lake Providence (June 1940)

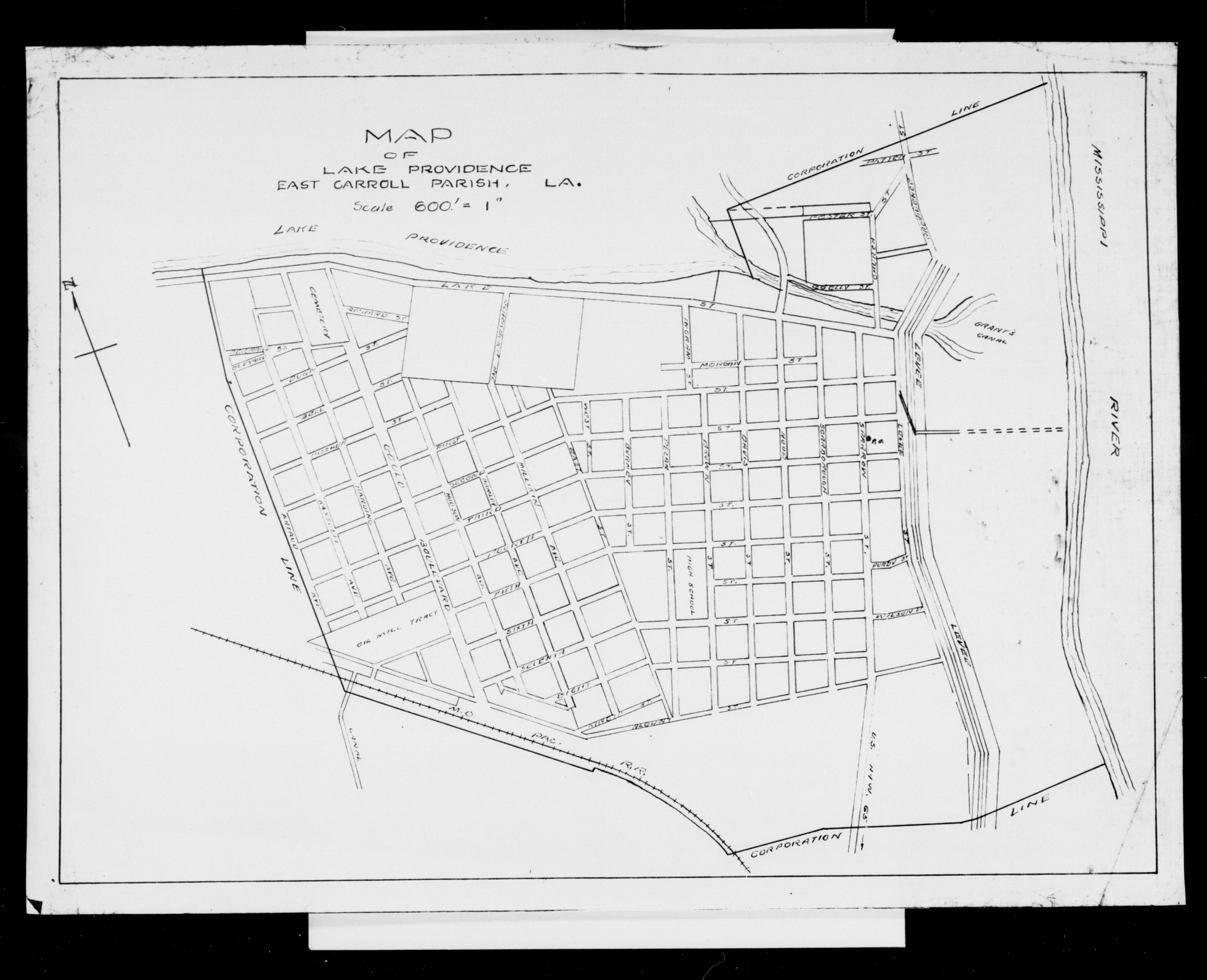
Street map of Lake Providence c. 1945

After the Reconstruction Era, many black people worked as sharecroppers or tenant farmers in the region. In 1898, Louisiana, like other southern states, enacted a new constitution, designed to maintain Democratic Party dominance and forestall any alliances such as the Populist-Republican alliance that had won seats in the 1890s. They included provisions that raised barriers to voter registration and elections, effectively disenfranchising most blacks despite their constitutional 15th Amendment right to vote. Their exclusion from the political system made them second-class citizens.

The civil rights movement of the post-World War II period from the 1940s through the 1960s brought efforts of a new generation to make constitutional rights more equitable. Until 1962, no African Americans had been allowed to register to vote in Lake Providence or East Carroll Parish in forty years when U.S. District Judge Edwin Ford Hunter Jr., based in Lake Charles in the far southwestern corner of the state, personally registered twenty-eight African Americans in Lake Providence under a provision of the Civil Rights Act of 1960, which had been signed into law by U.S. President Dwight D. Eisenhower. Hunter was challenged by Louisiana 6th Judicial District Judge Frank Voelker Sr., who was based in Lake Providence, in a dispute over the powers of the national government. The case attracted national attention, as the civil rights movement highlighted the constitutional infringement of the rights of African Americans in the South.

Following national Democratic support for the passage of civil rights legislation in the mid-1960s, most African Americans allied with that party. With a majority African-American electorate, Lake Providence voters in the 21st century continue to support Democratic Party candidates. Conservative whites tended to leave the Democratic Party after the 1960s, and have overwhelmingly joined the Republican Party. In the 2008 and 2012 presidential elections, East Carroll Parish voted handily for Democrat Barack H. Obama of Illinois, rather than his Republican opponents, John McCain of Arizona and Mitt Romney of Massachusetts.

== Geography ==
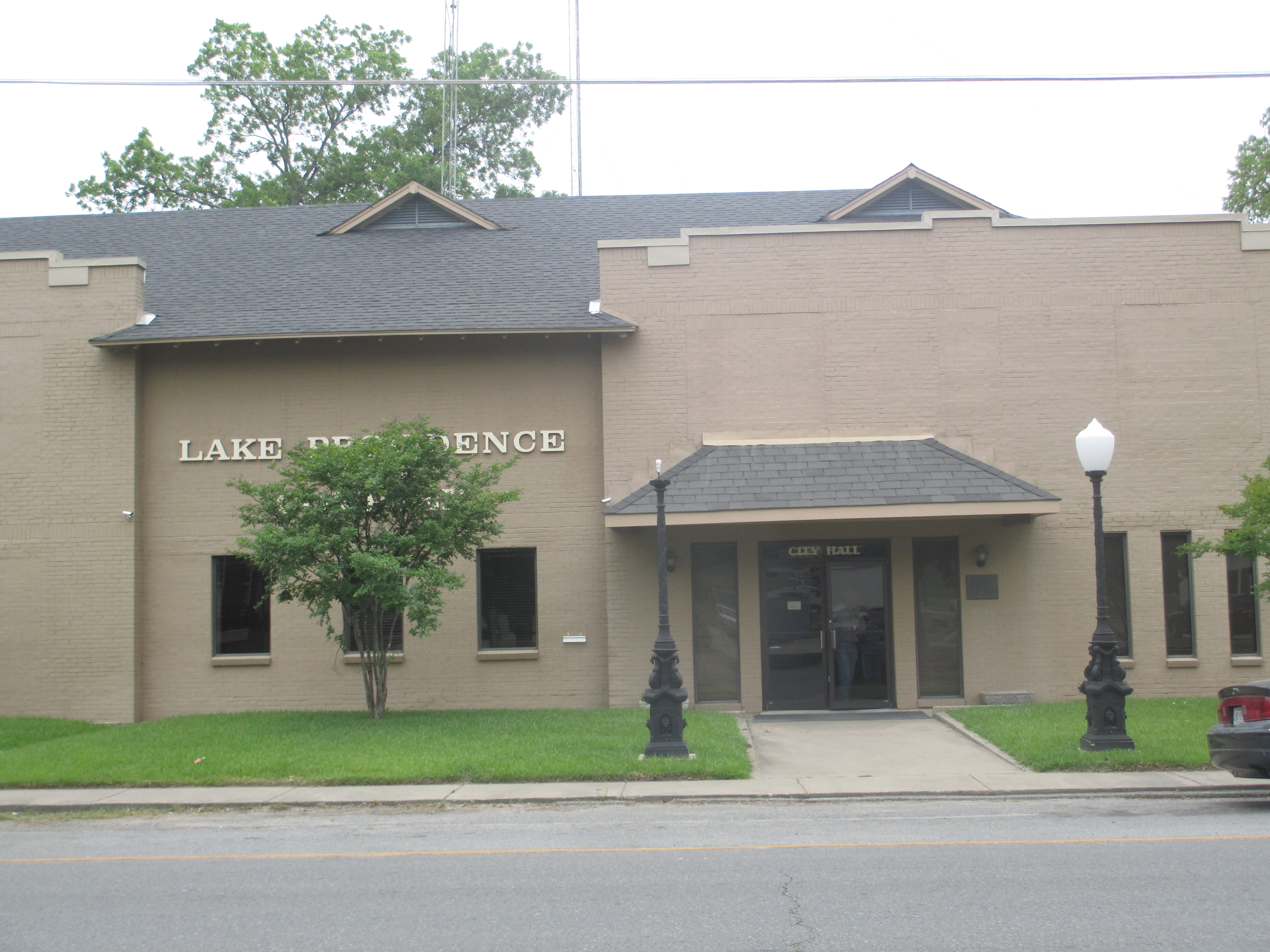
Lake Providence City Hall is located across from the U.S. Post Office.

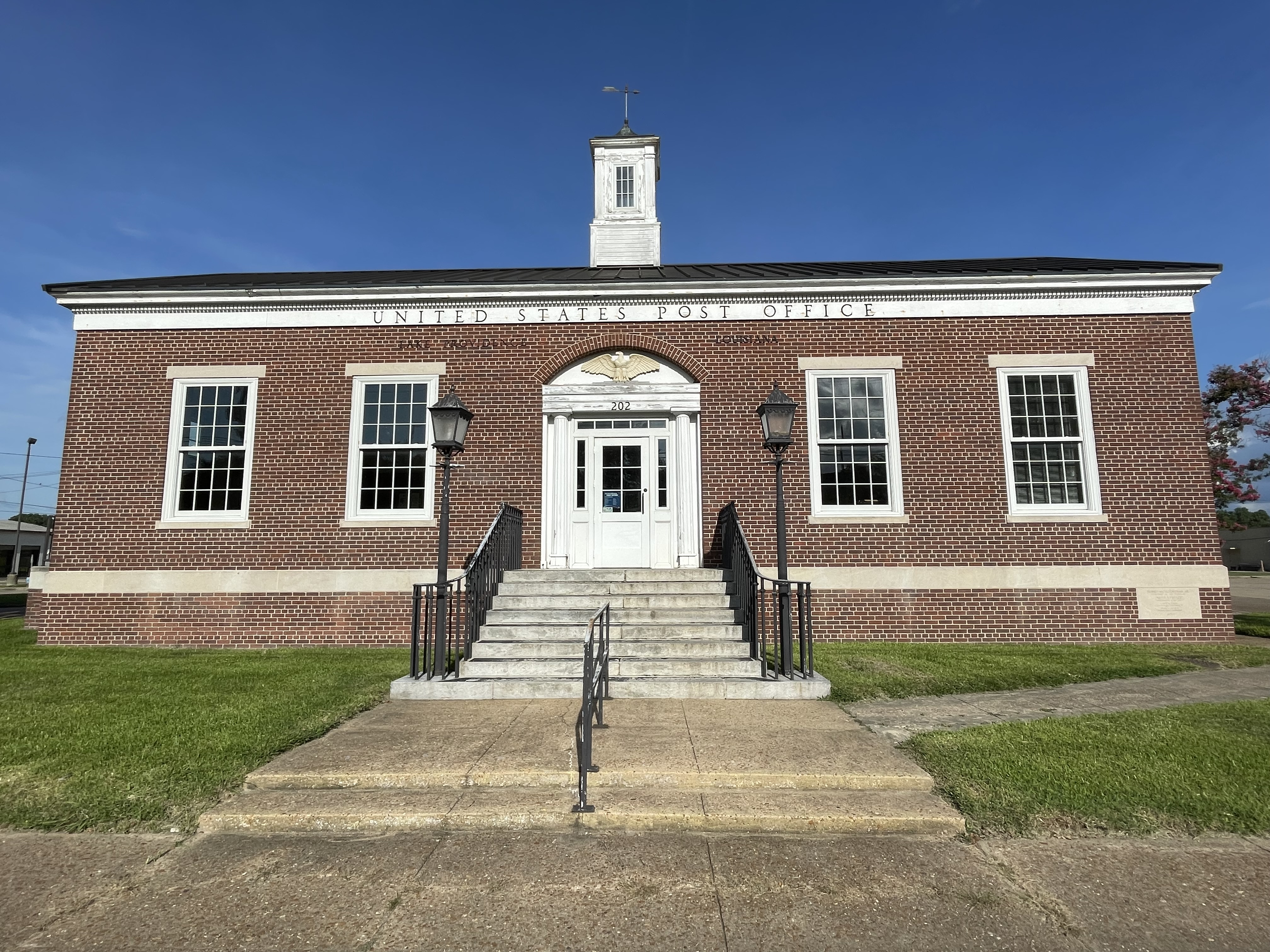
Post Office in Lake Providence, Louisiana.

According to the United States Census Bureau, the town has a total area of 3.6 square miles (9.3 km^{2}), of which 3.6 square miles (9.3 km^{2}) is land and 0.04 square miles (0.10 km^{2}) (0.55%) is water.

The existing boundaries of the town constitute the third location of the community. Lake Providence is located adjacent to the Mississippi River. Prior to the building of the current levee system by the United States Army Corps of Engineers, the meandering river would overflow its bank and take valuable lands. It was such flooding that the lake of Lake Providence was created and the town was washed away by the river. Each time the town was taken by the river, the citizens moved.

Historian John D. Winters describes Lake Providence as "a beautiful oxbow lake some six miles (10 km) long, an old Mississippi river bed with an outlet through Baxter Bayou into Bayou Macon and thus into the Tensas, Ouachita, Black, and Red rivers.

=== Climate ===
Lake Providence has a humid subtropical climate (Köppen Cfa) with long, hot summers and short, mild winters.

Climate data for Lake Providence, Louisiana (1991–2020 normals, extremes 1893–1903, 1926–2019)
Month	Jan	Feb	Mar	Apr	May	Jun	Jul	Aug	Sep	Oct	Nov	Dec	Year
Record high °F (°C)	86 (30)	89 (32)	93 (34)	95 (35)	99 (37)	108 (42)	109 (43)	109 (43)	110 (43)	98 (37)	90 (32)	88 (31)	110 (43)
Mean maximum °F (°C)	73.4 (23.0)	77.2 (25.1)	82.2 (27.9)	86.9 (30.5)	90.9 (32.7)	95.3 (35.2)	98.0 (36.7)	98.3 (36.8)	95.8 (35.4)	90.4 (32.4)	81.8 (27.7)	76.1 (24.5)	99.4 (37.4)
Mean daily maximum °F (°C)	53.7 (12.1)	58.2 (14.6)	66.4 (19.1)	74.4 (23.6)	81.9 (27.7)	88.4 (31.3)	91.2 (32.9)	91.1 (32.8)	86.8 (30.4)	77.1 (25.1)	65.2 (18.4)	56.3 (13.5)	74.2 (23.4)
Daily mean °F (°C)	44.8 (7.1)	48.6 (9.2)	56.2 (13.4)	64.2 (17.9)	72.6 (22.6)	79.5 (26.4)	82.3 (27.9)	81.8 (27.7)	76.7 (24.8)	66.1 (18.9)	54.7 (12.6)	47.3 (8.5)	64.6 (18.1)
Mean daily minimum °F (°C)	35.8 (2.1)	39.0 (3.9)	45.9 (7.7)	54.0 (12.2)	63.4 (17.4)	70.6 (21.4)	73.4 (23.0)	72.5 (22.5)	66.5 (19.2)	55.0 (12.8)	44.3 (6.8)	38.4 (3.6)	54.9 (12.7)
Mean minimum °F (°C)	21.3 (−5.9)	26.7 (−2.9)	31.2 (−0.4)	40.7 (4.8)	51.5 (10.8)	62.8 (17.1)	67.8 (19.9)	66.6 (19.2)	54.2 (12.3)	40.6 (4.8)	30.1 (−1.1)	25.6 (−3.6)	19.6 (−6.9)
Record low °F (°C)	−5 (−21)	−8 (−22)	16 (−9)	31 (−1)	38 (3)	49 (9)	55 (13)	55 (13)	35 (2)	25 (−4)	18 (−8)	3 (−16)	−8 (−22)
Average precipitation inches (mm)	5.61 (142)	5.49 (139)	5.16 (131)	6.59 (167)	4.98 (126)	4.26 (108)	3.93 (100)	4.03 (102)	3.29 (84)	4.99 (127)	4.72 (120)	5.74 (146)	58.79 (1,493)
Average snowfall inches (cm)	0.2 (0.51)	0.2 (0.51)	0.0 (0.0)	0.0 (0.0)	0.0 (0.0)	0.0 (0.0)	0.0 (0.0)	0.0 (0.0)	0.0 (0.0)	0.0 (0.0)	0.0 (0.0)	0.1 (0.25)	0.5 (1.3)
Average precipitation days (≥ 0.01 in)	9.6	9.0	9.2	8.0	8.6	8.2	8.1	7.5	5.5	6.5	8.4	10.1	98.7
Average snowy days (≥ 0.1 in)	0.1	0.2	0.1	0.0	0.0	0.0	0.0	0.0	0.0	0.0	0.0	0.0	0.4
Source: NOAA

== Demographics ==
Historical population
Census	Pop.	Note	%±
1860	582		—
1870	320		−45.0%
1890	642		—
1900	1,256		95.6%
1910	1,568		24.8%
1920	1,917		22.3%
1930	2,867		49.6%
1940	3,711		29.4%
1950	4,123		11.1%
1960	5,781		40.2%
1970	6,183		7.0%
1980	6,361		2.9%
1990	5,380		−15.4%
2000	5,104		−5.1%
2010	3,991		−21.8%
2020	3,587		−10.1%
2025 (est.)	3,147	▼	−12.3%
U.S. Decennial Census

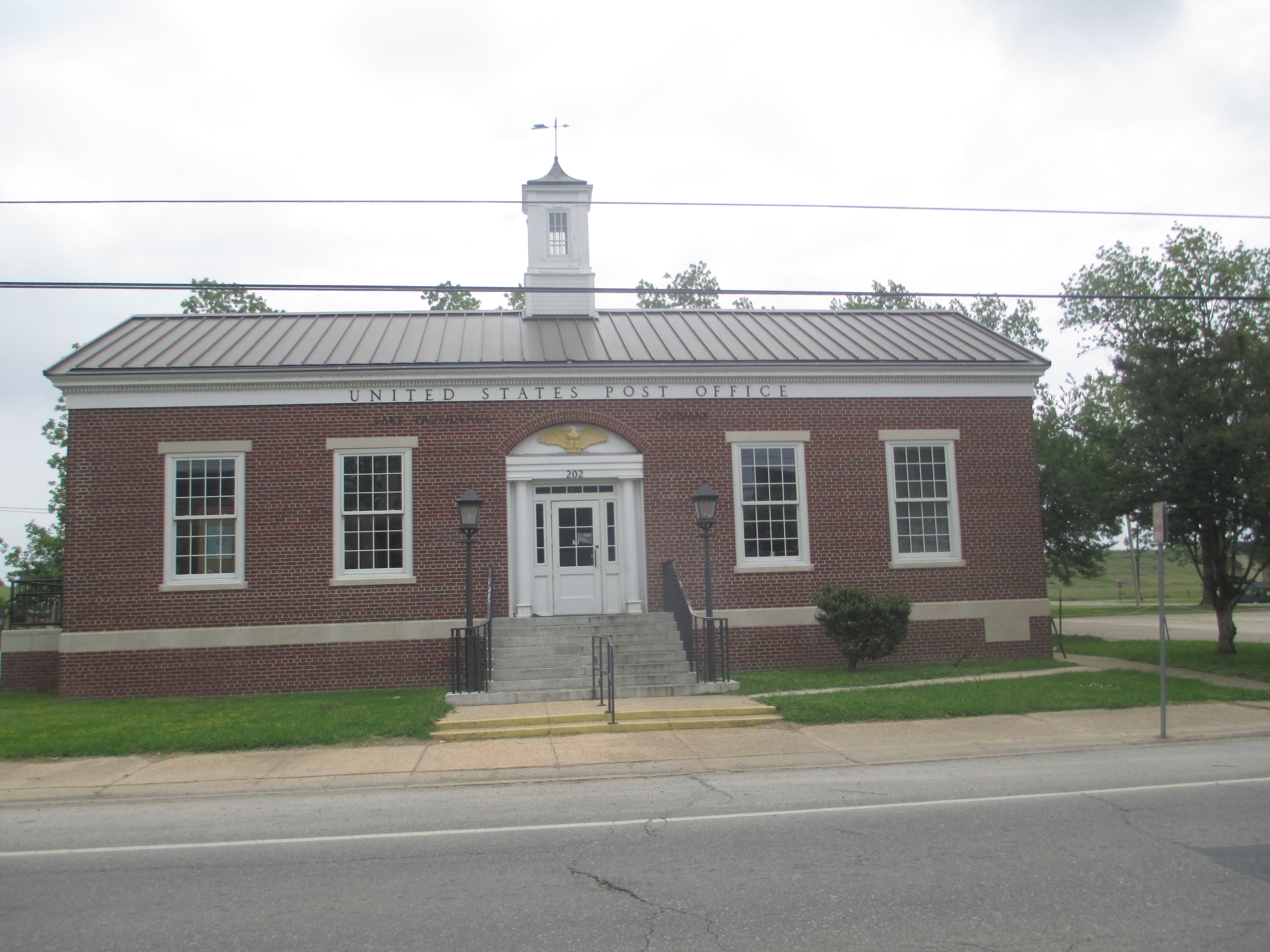
U.S. Post Office in Lake Providence contains a 1942 mural by Ethel Edwards titled Life on the Lake

=== 2020 census ===
As of the 2020 census, Lake Providence had a population of 3,587, with 1,439 households and 695 families.

The median age was 36.3 years. 29.3% of residents were under the age of 18 and 16.1% of residents were 65 years of age or older. For every 100 females there were 88.3 males, and for every 100 females age 18 and over there were 83.4 males age 18 and over.

0.0% of residents lived in urban areas, while 100.0% lived in rural areas.

Of the 1,439 households, 36.1% had children under the age of 18 living in them. Of all households, 21.5% were married-couple households, 23.3% were households with a male householder and no spouse or partner present, and 46.9% were households with a female householder and no spouse or partner present. About 33.5% of all households were made up of individuals and 13.7% had someone living alone who was 65 years of age or older.

There were 1,689 housing units, of which 14.8% were vacant. The homeowner vacancy rate was 1.1% and the rental vacancy rate was 7.9%.

Lake Providence racial composition as of 2020
Race	Num.	Perc.
White (non-Hispanic)	597	16.64%
Black or African American (non-Hispanic)	2,883	80.37%
Asian	4	0.11%
Other/Mixed	73	2.04%
Hispanic or Latino	30	0.84%

== Education ==
Public schools operated by the East Carroll Parish School Board include Southside Elementary School (PK-5), Lake Providence Junior High School (grades 6–8), and Lake Providence Senior High School (9–12). The private school Briarfield Academy is grades PK to 12.

== Representation in other media ==
Several episodes of the 1959 NBC television series Riverboat, starring Darren McGavin, deal with pirates on the Mississippi River or the shipment of cotton. It is set in the middle 19th century, rather than the 18th.

== Notable people ==
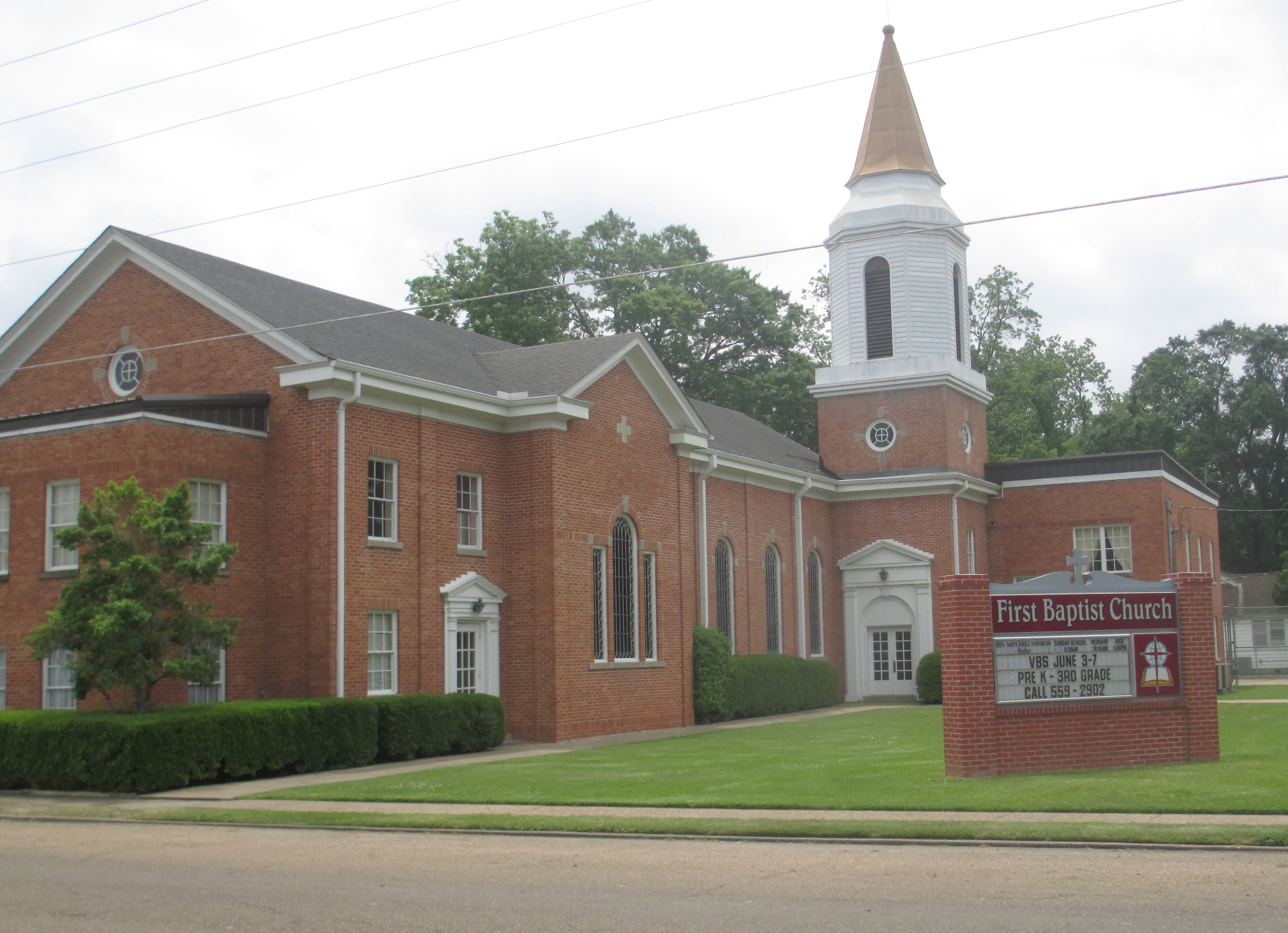
First Baptist Church at 304 Davis Street in Lake Providence

- Clifford Cleveland Brooks, planter in St. Joseph, represented East Carroll Parish in the state senate from 1924 to 1932.
- Vail M. Delony, state representative from East Carroll Parish, 1940–1967; Speaker of the Louisiana House, 1964–1967.
- Leonard Griffin, NFL player
- William J. Jefferson, former U.S. representative from Louisiana's 2nd congressional district; convicted felon.
- Joseph Kerr, U.S. Senator; moved to Lake Providence as an adult. Kerr's son, Joseph Kerr Jr., was born at Lake Providence, and died in the Battle of the Alamo.
- Joseph E. Ransdell, Lake Providence lawyer and planter; former member of the United States House of Representatives and three-term U.S. Senator.
- Vivien Theodore Thomas, an American laboratory supervisor who developed a procedure used to treat blue baby syndrome (now known as cyanotic heart disease) in the 1940s.
- Norris C. Williamson, state senator from the Delta parishes from 1916 to 1932
- Edith Wilmans, first woman elected to the Texas State Legislature
- John D. Winters, Civil War historian
- Charles and Sam Wyly, billionaire entrepreneur brothers, founders of Uccel, Sterling Software, and Green Mountain Energy; the Tower of Learning at Louisiana Tech University in Ruston is named in honor of Charles Wyly.
