= Panvalet =

Mainframe version control system

CA Panvalet
- Developers: Pansophic Systems; Computer Associates
- Initial release: 1969
- Operating system: z/OS, z/VSE
- Type: Revision control
- License: Proprietary
- Website: www.broadcom.com/products/mainframe/application-development/panvalet

Computer Associates Panvalet (also known as CA-Panvalet) is a revision control and source code management system originally developed by Pansophic Systems for mainframe computers such as the IBM System z and IBM System/370 running the z/OS and z/VSE operating systems.

CA-PAN/LCM is a similar product for PCs.

== Overview ==
Panvalet can be used to manage program source code, JCL, Macros/commands for utilities such as Easytrieve and object module files.

== History ==
Panvalet was developed by Pansophic Systems in 1969 as a program to store and manage computer program source code on direct-access storage devices. Before Panvalet code was saved as paper punch cards, typically with 500 to 3,000 cards per program, often 1,000,000 or more per data center. Cards were bulky, difficult to store and transport, difficult and costly to back up, and prone to catastrophic errors since one misplaced card could prevent a program from running correctly.

Pansophic began selling the program in 1970 at a price of $2,880 per copy. It was immediately successful.

In 1978, it was reported that Panvalet, at the time a product of Pansophic Systems, Inc, was in use at over 3,000 sites.

Throughout much of its existence, the main competitor to Panvalet was The Librarian product from Applied Data Research. It had roughly the same number of installations as Panvalet. As recollected by Piscopo, "Panvalet and Librarian basically divided the program library market between the two of them.... Virtually everyone ended up with one or the other of the products."

Computer Associates acquired Panvalet in 1991 when it purchased Pansophic Systems for $390M. Broadcom acquired Panvalet in 2018 when it purchased Computer Associates.

== See also ==
- CA Technologies
