= CA-Telon =

Original TELON logo, showing the eight concentric circles representing an octave. Courtesy Don Christensen

TELON, later renamed CA-TELON, is one of the first commercially successful application generators for building business applications.

== Overview ==
TELON is an application development system currently sold and maintained by CA Technologies (formerly CA, Inc. and Computer Associates International, Inc.). When it was introduced in 1981, it was one of the first computer-aided software engineering ("CASE") tools on the commercial market. The developer tools run on IBM's MVS operating systems using TSO (IBM's Time Sharing Option) and personal computers ("PCs") running MS-Windows and the target environments include IMS and CICS transaction processing systems. TELON supported multiple database technologies, including IBM's VSAM, IMS/DB, DB2, plus Cullinet's IDMS.

TELON is an application code generator that uses macros to generate COBOL, COBOL/II, or PL/I code that can run natively in the target environment without run-time proprietary code. Developers create screen designs in the TELON Design Facility (TDF) and define attributes for the screen. The design can then be run through a prototyper to test screen flow. Next, macros generate the code using the information created by the TDF. Lastly, the TELON Test Facility is used, in conjunction with code debuggers, to search for and fix bugs before the application is moved into production.

== History ==
=== Early stages ===
TELON was originally conceived and designed by Chris McNeil and Don Christensen in the late 1970s when McNeil was a software engineer at Liberty Mutual Insurance Company and Christensen was an IBM Systems Engineer contracting with Liberty Mutual. During their tenure, Liberty Mutual installed an IBM 3790 minicomputer along with a claims processing system (CAPS) created by Insurance Systems of America. Christensen worked with McNeil on a project that customized the package for use at Liberty Mutual. This customization, which involved IBM's cumbersome Macro language, required an engineer to create multiple forms for each IBM 3270 screen and then to convert the screens for executing on the 3790. It was awkward to use (McNeil called it "distributed head-ache") and so Christensen used the Macro language to create a generator that could create each form from a single source. This was the first step leading to the development of TELON.

Christensen and McNeil spent the following few years working on the next claims processing application. McNeil designed the template COBOL programs and Christensen coded the macros to generate the actual COBOL programs. They created a system that could generate COBOL code from screen layouts created by users. The COBOL ran in IBM's TSO interactive environment and it allowed the users and engineers to test screen flow. When a user wanted a change, the layout was altered using a design tool and new COBOL was generated. This turned out to be a very successful way to prototype the new system. Liberty Mutual put out a bid to create the new system which the Digital Equipment Corporation won in 1979. Christensen then left IBM to work as a private consultant for Liberty Mutual. When Liberty Mutual moved their offices to New Hampshire in that year, McNeil left the company to study classical guitar on Cape Cod.

Christensen expanded the macros for the system (which he was calling ADS at the time—Application Development System) to generate COBOL for IBM's IMS transaction environment. He then tried to persuade Liberty Mutual management to use the expanded system to generate a new application that Liberty Mutual was working on. The conservative management balked at using an untried system for mission-critical applications and declined. In 1981, Christensen started to look outside of Liberty Mutual for potential customers for ADS.

=== Christensen Systems, Inc ===
==== Technical direction ====
In 1981 Don Christensen was introduced to Phil Stymfal, a software engineer who was in charge of technical decisions at New England Life Insurance (NELI). Stymfal immediately saw the advantages of ADS and was unafraid to try new products. He recommended that NELI purchase TELON and NELI became the first commercial customer by signing a license agreement for $30k in mid-1981.

When the system proved itself at NELI, Stymfal used his connections through The New England Productivity Group to generate more interest in TELON. Through these contacts Christensen was able to sign two more Boston-area customers to $30k license agreements: Raytheon and John Hancock Life Insurance. Christensen has stated that TELON might never have been successful without Stymfal's influence and his confidence in recommending an untried product.

Not long before the NELI contract, Christensen left Liberty Mutual to start his own company. Since ADS had been written on Liberty Mutual's mainframe, Christensen left with the understanding that if Liberty ever decided to use TELON it could acquire the software free of charge. Christensen Systems Inc. was created soon after the NELI signing and its first employee was Chris McNeil, who had worked with Christensen back at Liberty Mutual before moving to Cape Cod. His responsibilities included supporting NELI and to continuing work on TELON.

When it was obvious that TELON was becoming a successful product and that CSI was a stable company, Liberty Mutual became the fourth customer by the end of 1981. They were able to use the software for free but later signed a support agreement. In a fitting tribute, both the original Liberty Mutual CAPS system and second claims processing applications that McNeil and Christensen worked on while employed at Liberty Mutual were rewritten using TELON.

With four major customers by early 1982, CSI hired Stymfal as the second employee to work alongside McNeil. Stymfal's role was as Director of Development and he, together with McNeil, made most of the technological decisions regarding TELON until their departure in 1987. By this point, Christensen had moved into more of a sales and marketing position. An office was opened in Quincy, Massachusetts, and developer Gig Kirk was hired in September. In October Bob Giel, an acquaintance of Stymfal, was hired as Director of Finance to handle business and sales planning.

The name TELON had not yet been created and the system was still being called by its generic name, ADS. Casual research was done to come up with a name. Christensen was drawn to using Greek works and originally explored using Telos (Greek for "purpose" or "goal") but it was already utilized by a software company in California. Finally TELON was chosen as a contraction of Telos and Eon (forever). McNeil created a draft of the TELON logo, using eight concentric circles to represent an octave and the multiple steps of evolutionary development. A local graphic designer was then hired to draw it professionally.

The ease with which CSI was able to attract its first four customers caused a lack of urgency in pursuing further sales. Christensen did not create a large enough sales pipeline to keep up the growth, creating a lull in sales. This would later contribute to the decision to sell CSI to Pansophic Systems.

Through 1982–83 development of TELON would continue with additional features being added including:

- Generating COBOL for executing in the CICS environment.
- Generating PL/I. TELON was the only one of the major CASE generators that generated PL/I
- Supporting multiple databases including IMS/DB and DB2.

By this time TELON itself was starting to become a large application. The TELON Design Facility (TDF) was a series of TSO applications that took users through the creation of their screens. It had been decided from the beginning that the TDF would be written with TELON itself. Christensen would later remark that this helped guarantee that TELON would be a robust system because developers would be forced to use it. It also gave CSI ideas for ways to improve productivity.

==== Financial picture ====
TELON sales figures for the 1980s(Source: Bob Giel)
Year	Sales
1981:	$110k
1982:	$850k
1983:	$1.8m
1984:	$3m
1985:	$6m
1986:	$12m
1987:	$18m
1988:	$28m
1989:	$34m

Almost all of the early sales for TELON were generated through Phil Stymfal's contacts with other insurance companies. These contacts gave CSI a chance to give a demo at the companies which usually ended in a sale. Companies outside of Stymfal's circle were reluctant to look at TELON perhaps because it was much less expensive than its main competitors at the time, Informatics' Mark V and IBM's application generator, and was, therefore, not taken seriously. In 1982, TELON for IMS was being sold for $75,000 so CSI raised the price to $95,000 to give it more credibility. The price of the CICS offering was also increased. Two years later, after it was acquired by Pansophic Systems, TELON would see another price increase for much the same reasons.

In 1982 CSI was able to secure $100,000 in working capital from the Boston area consulting firm Computer Partners in exchange for the exclusive right to bring TELON into Boston area companies. A year later CSI bought out its commitment by securing a loan from State Street Bank and Trust Company.

==== Advantages of TELON over its competitors ====
The main asset of TELON was that it worked; customers were able to see immediate returns on their investment in the software. In the early years, when TELON was cheaper, it would take only one project for a customer to break even. Even after the price increases, companies could recoup their costs quickly.

Because TELON generated fully independent COBOL code, the resulting applications could be maintained by traditional methods (i.e. "by hand") if CSI were ever to become insolvent. This made the decision to purchase TELON less risky for those companies that were given a trial since they would not have to scrap their application.

This is in direct contrast to the two main competitors of the time, Informatics' Mark V and IBM's application generator. Mark V was an add-on to Informatics' successful report generator Mark IV but it was unwieldy and didn't address as much of the development lifecycle as TELON. IBM's solution required a run-time component for the generated applications to execute, putting the customer in a long-term bind with IBM. Both products were much more expensive than TELON and head-to-head trials proved TELON to be more productive.

TELON gave a standard structure and design to all the applications written with it. Developers could easily understand the design of any TELON application once he or she was familiar with the TELON methodology.

=== Pansophic Systems ===
In 1983 CSI pursued multiple avenues for acquiring venture capital, all which proved unsuccessful. By this time new competitors to TELON had emerged, in particular, a system from Sage Software, and Giel was becoming concerned that CSI's sales force was not sufficient to stay ahead of the competition. One of the venture capitalists who had been contacted suggested that TELON would be a good fit with Pansophic Systems because they had a strong and effective sales force.

Pansophic was a software company based in Chicago founded by Joseph A. Piscopo in 1969. In 1983 while doing background research on EASYTRIEVE, a 4th generation language they had acquired, Pansophic became impressed with the enthusiasm of TELON customers. In March 1984, they began discussions with CSI to purchase the company. Christensen came away believing that Pansophic knew the market and customers for TELON. In April 1984 Pansophic made an offer of $2 million in addition to royalties for three years. The quartet of Christensen, McNeil, Stymfal, and Giel decided to accept the offer and the deal became realized in November 1984.

The acquisition became a successful one for both companies. TELON gained the advantages of a large and experienced sales force, run by Pansophic's Al Seyler, who had previously sold Informatics' Mark IV. In return, Pansophic gained a strong product with sales that would continue to climb for many years. A few years after the deal, Christensen was told by an industry observer that no software merger had ever gone as smoothly or productively.

One of the first things Pansophic did was to raise the price of TELON to match its competitors. The IMS product was increased from $95,000 per license to $225,000 and the CICS product was raised from $50,000 to $160,000. This gave TELON the credibility to compete head-to-head with their competitors and made them the choice of companies about half the time.

In 1986, Pansophic Transferred Farzin Yashar from their development team in Reston, VA to Boston in order to head development of the first PC version of TELON TDF. Farzin and Chris McNeil together led the efforts and created Telon PC for PC DOS/MS-DOS, which was distributed on floppy diskettes. The product was launched in 1987 and became an immediate success.

==== Release 2.0 problems ====
TELON 2.0 was the first major release of TELON after it was acquired by Pansophic. Among other things, it added support for IBM's DB2 database system. 2.0 was plagued by delays, revolving management, and was released in 1987 with many bugs. As a result, TELON lost some of its market share and almost lost its lead in the industry. It took a few years before TELON was again considered a solid product.

==== Telon/38 ====
For a short period in the late 1980s, Pansophic marketed a product known as Telon/38, targeted at the IBM System/38 platform. Telon/38 was a rebranded version of the Synon/2 tool from Synon. Years later, Synon/2 also came to be acquired by CA and is now known as CA 2E.

=== Computer Associates ("CA") ===
Despite the continued success of TELON, Pansophic began to lose money. In 1990, Pansophic lost over $14 million and cut more than 300 workers, decreasing its workforce to 1,214. With its large installed customer base, this made Pansophic an attractive target for Computer Associates International, Inc., which purchased the company in September 1991.

TELON was renamed CA-TELON and the development group was slashed by about 60%. This began a long, profitable time for CA as it maintained and updated TELON for its customers. In October 2006, CA announced the release of CA-Telon 5.0.

== Sources ==
- Interviews with Christensen, Kirk, McNeil, et al. in 2006. See Discussion page for transcripts.
- CA, online brochure.
- CA, 5.0 release announcement.
