= Martin Goetz =

American software engineer (1930–2023)

- Born: 22 April 1930; Brooklyn
- Died: 10 October 2023 (aged 93); Brighton
- Education: Brooklyn Technical High School, Brooklyn College, City College of New York
- Occupation: Businessperson, programmer
- Employer: Applied Data Research

Martin A. Goetz (April 22, 1930 – October 10, 2023) was an American software engineer and pioneer in the development of the commercial software industry. He held the first software patent, and was product manager of Autoflow from Applied Data Research (ADR), which is generally cited as the first commercial software application.

In the early 1960s, the status of software as a standalone industry was unclear. The software was generally custom-developed for a single customer, bundled with hardware, or given away free. Goetz and ADR played a substantial role in defining software as a standalone product, and clarifying that it could be protected by intellectual property laws.

In 2007, Computerworld cited Goetz as an "Unsung Innovator" in the computer industry. He was named the "Father of Third-Party Software" by mainframezone.com.

In late 2009, Goetz wrote an editorial in the patent blog Patently-O advocating software patents. Goetz argued that there is no principled difference between software and hardware patents and that truly patent-able software innovations require just as much ingenuity and advancement as any other kind of patentable subject matter.

== First software patent ==
In 1964, Goetz attended a conference on software intellectual property issues. He subsequently decided that an improved data sorting algorithm he had developed was patentable.

Data sorting was an important issue for the mainframe computers of the day, many of which used magnetic tape for storage. A more efficient data sorting procedure could save substantial amounts of program execution time by reducing the numbers of read and write operations, and reducing the wait time for tape to rewind.

Goetz filed the patent application on April 9, 1965, and it was granted on April 23, 1968, as U.S. Patent No. 3,380,029. For the application had to build what Burton Grad of the Computer History Museum later described as a "hardware-fake", but Computerworld reported the news as: "First Patent is Issued for Software, Full Implications Are Not Yet Known".

== First commercial software product ==
The idea of software as a product category separate from computer hardware developed gradually in the 1950s and 1960s. The first independent software firms were consultancies that did custom programming for mainframe companies and their customers. Libraries of basic software programs were provided at no additional charge by mainframe manufacturers, and more complicated software was custom-tailored to each business that used it. The idea of off-the-shelf commercial software, with a standard feature set used in the same way across a wide range of customers, did not yet exist.

In 1965, Applied Data Research was one of those custom software development firms. It wrote a software program for RCA mainframes called Autoflow, designed to create flowcharts documenting the structure of other computer programs (such flowcharts were an important tool for documenting and maintaining software). RCA decided not to license the product. Other computer manufacturers also refused to license Autoflow, so in 1965 Goetz decided to market it directly to RCA mainframe users. This is generally cited as the first time that a software program was marketed and sold as a standalone product.

The RCA version of Autoflow sold only two licenses, but it became a commercial success in subsequent years as it was advertised, improved, and ported to other mainframes. The rise of Autoflow and other software products, like MARK IV from Informatics, Inc., coupled with IBM's decision to unbundle software from its mainframes, helped facilitate the growth of the commercial software industry in the 1970s and beyond.
