= Pansophic Systems =

American software company

- Company type: Public
- Industry: Software
- Founded: 1969; 57 years ago in Oak Brook, Illinois
- Founder: Joseph A. Piscopo
- Defunct: October 31, 1991; 34 years ago
- Fate: Acquired by Computer Associates
- Headquarters: Lisle, Illinois, United States
- Key people: David J. Eskra
- Products: Panvalet; Easytrieve; TELON
- Number of employees: 1,600 (1991)

Pansophic Systems, Inc., or simply Pansophic (Ancient Greek for "universal knowledge"), was a major American software company active from 1969 to 1991 and based in the Chicago metropolitan area. A pioneering software firm, it was among the first wave of independent software vendors in the late 1960s. Initially a supplier of source code and information management software for IBM mainframe computers with their flagship products Panvalet and Easytrieve, the company soon expanded into the minicomputer and personal computer markets, supplying application packages for many differing fields. The company was acquired by and absorbed into Computer Associates in October 1991 for nearly $300 million.

== History ==
Pansophic Systems was founded in 1969 in Oak Brook, Illinois, by Joseph A. Piscopo (1944–2021). The company was begun with four employees and $150,000 of startup capital obtained by Piscopo's uncle Emil Piscopo and was initially incorporated from the second story of a storefront in the Chicago suburb of Oak Brook. The company was founded in the middle of Joe Piscopo's MBA studies; although he had formal training as a computer scientist in his prior job at Montgomery Ward, Joe was convinced to found Pansophic only after his uncle Emil had encouraged him to start his own business in the computing industry. Pansophic was among the first wave of independent software vendors in the late 1960s.

Pansophic's first product was Panvalet, a source code management software package for IBM mainframe users that stored program code on tape. The inspiration for Panvalet came from Piscopo's own anxieties delivering the easily shufflable punched cards from Montgomery Ward's headquarters to outside institutions such as NYSE Chicago. Panvalet initially sold poorly, the company only generating sales of US$28,000 in 1970. Joe Piscopo sought to have Panvalet bought outright to one of the large computer services companies then in business, but there were no takers; instead, he began marketing and selling the product directly to data processing development shops that were using IBM mainframes. By 1973 Panvalet was already being well-received in the market. The company eventually saw Panvalet installed at over 6,000 sites worth some $100 million in revenues by 1991.

In its early years, the company also engaged in redistributing IBM mainframe software made by others. One such product was CA-SORT, made by the Switzerland-based Computer Associates International Ltd, which Pansophic sold in North America for a couple of years in the mid-1970s under the name Pansort. (After another transfer of rights, CA-SORT became a foundational product for the American firm Computer Associates.) Another such product was Easytrieve, an early instance of a report generator, which was developed by Ribek Corporation but marketed and sold by Pansophic. Easytrieve became quite successful in the IBM mainframe world, so much so that Pansophic would end up acquiring the product outright. Panvalet and Easytrieve provided the two big commercial successes that powered the growth of Pansophic.

Pansophic filed to go public in 1980. Around that time, David J. Eskra, who had been hired the previous year as vice president of marketing, was named president and chief operating officer of the company, with Joe Piscopo remaining as chief executive officer. With the infusion of capital gained by the IPO, the company soon went on an acquisition binge in an effort to expand further. In November 1984, by which point it was worth $53 million and had 7,600 installations, Pansophic acquired Christensen Systems, Inc., of Quincy, Massachusetts. Christensen had developed TELON, an integrated development environment for business software running on top of IBM's CICS and IMS. By acquiring Christensen, Pansophic hoped to further its foothold in IBM's mainframe clientele, which numbered between 8,000 and 12,000 at the time. This was followed by a battery of further acquisitions in the software industry, diversifying the company away from solely mainframe software into the minicomputer and personal computer markets for fields as disparate as computer-aided software engineering, computer animation, computer graphics for presentation slides, and supply chain management. In November 1986 alone, Pansophic announced the acquisition of four large software vendors: Professional Computer Services of nearby Oakbrook Terrace—a provider of supply chain management software (for $19 million); the computer graphics division of AVL, Inc., of Tinton Falls, New Jersey—makers of presentation slide graphics software for the IBM Personal Computer and compatibles (for $2.5 million); Fusion Products of San Rafael, California—makers of various mainframe software (for $7.2 million); and SPSS Inc. of Chicago—developers of statistical analysis software (for $32 million). In January 1987, the acquisition of SPSS was called off, however.

Earnings reports for Pansophic were tracked by The New York Times.

Joe Piscopo left the company in 1987 to enter retirement at the age of 42, at which point his net worth was $20 million. Eskra was named as his successor. Piscopo's subsequent attempt to leave retirement to return to Pansophic was rejected by Eskra and the board of directors, leading to public animosity between Piscopo and Eskra; in early 1991, Piscopo sold his 360,000 shares (representing a 2 percent stake in the company) as a gesture of contempt. The company was hit hard by the early 1990s recession, its stock price decreasing from between $18 and $20 per share in 1987 to between $11 and $13 in 1991. Pansophic was further hurt by migration away from mainframe systems toward large deployments of personal computers in corporate environments. In its final years, the company ramped up its budget for its workstation products and discontinued redundant products in its mainframe product range. But for 1990, it ended up having a losing over $14 million, as set against revenues of $230 million.

In September 1991, Computer Associates of Garden City, New York, announced its acquisition of Pansophic for nearly $300 million. The acquisition was finalized on October 30, 1991. Between 500 and 600 of Pansophic Systems's 1,600 workers were laid off the following December.

== Sources ==
- Campbell-Kelly, Martin (2003). From Airline Reservations to Sonic the Hedgehog: A History of the Software Industry. MIT Press. ISBN 0262033038 – via the Internet Archive.
