= Applied Data Research =

Large US-based software vendor

Applied Data Research, Inc.
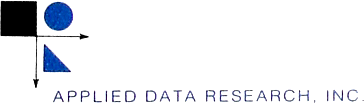
- Founded: 1959
- Founder: Martin Goetz, Sherman Blumenthal, Ellwood Kauffman, Dave McFadden, Bernard Riskin, Robert Wickenden, and Stephen Wright
- Defunct: 1986
- Fate: Acquired
- Successor: Ameritech
- Headquarters: Princeton, New Jersey, United States
- Services: independent contract programming

Applied Data Research, Inc. (ADR), was a large software vendor from the 1960s until the mid-1980s. ADR is often described as "the first independent software vendor".

Founded in 1959 by seven engineers who had previously worked at Sperry Rand, ADR was originally a contract development company. ADR eventually built a series of its own products. ADR's widely used major packages included: Autoflow for automatic flowcharting, which is often cited as one of the first commercial software applications; Roscoe, a remote job submission environment; MetaCOBOL, an extensible macro processor for the COBOL language; and The Librarian, for source-code management. By the end of the 1970s, ADR was considered to be one of the five biggest software product firms worldwide, and by the mid-1980s it had almost 20,000 distinct product installations across some 9,000 total customer sites.

The company's original office was in a small office building along U.S. Route 206 in Princeton Township, New Jersey. Later during the 1960s, they were part of a data center located on Route 206 across from Princeton Airport. The center was destroyed by fire in 1969 when a light plane crashed into it on approach to the airport, but there were no serious injuries among either the pilot or the workers in the building. In 1980, the company moved to a facility further along Route 206, that was just north of Princeton in Montgomery Township, New Jersey.

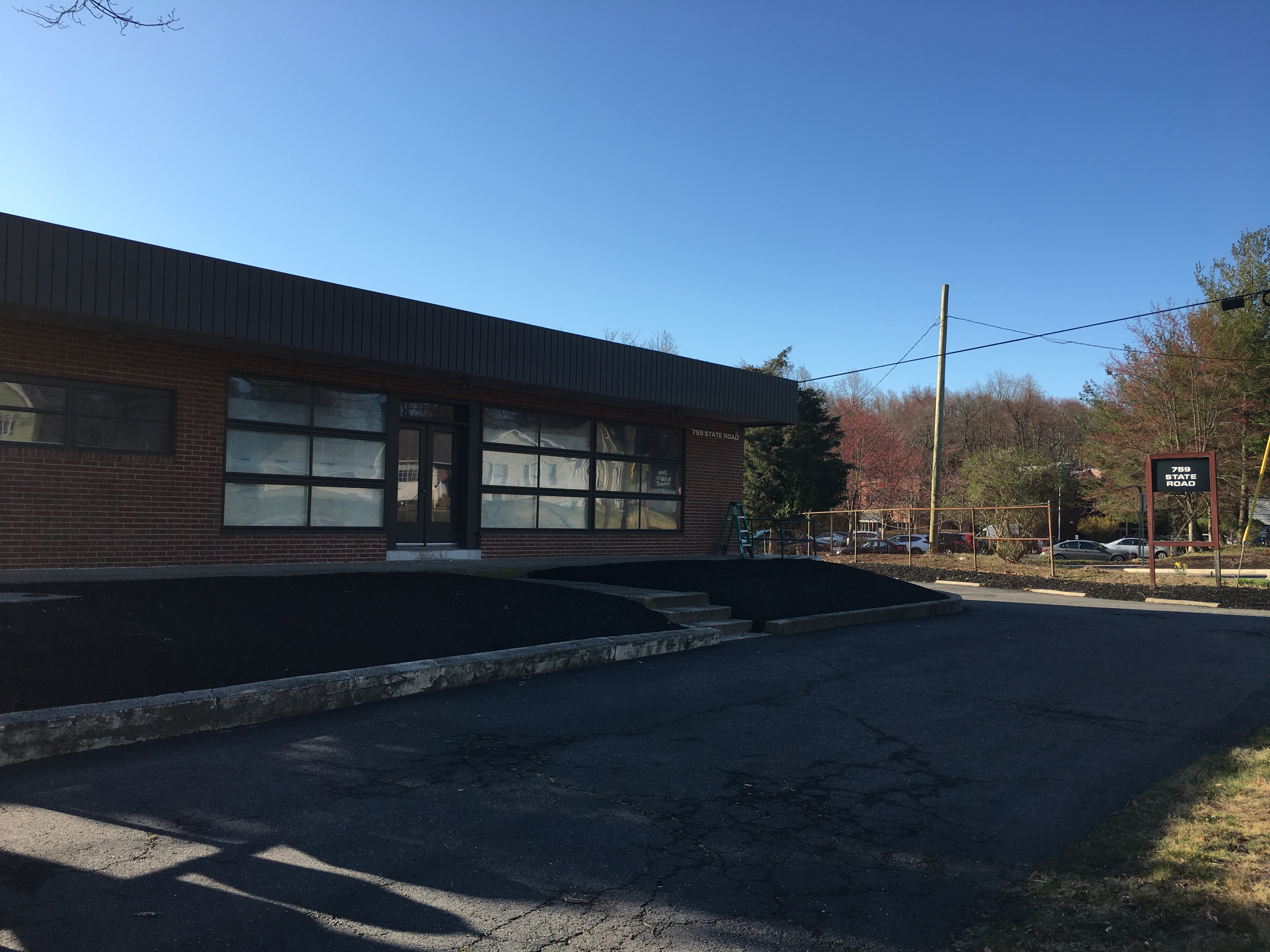
ADR's modest first office, at 759 State Road (U.S. Route 206) in Princeton

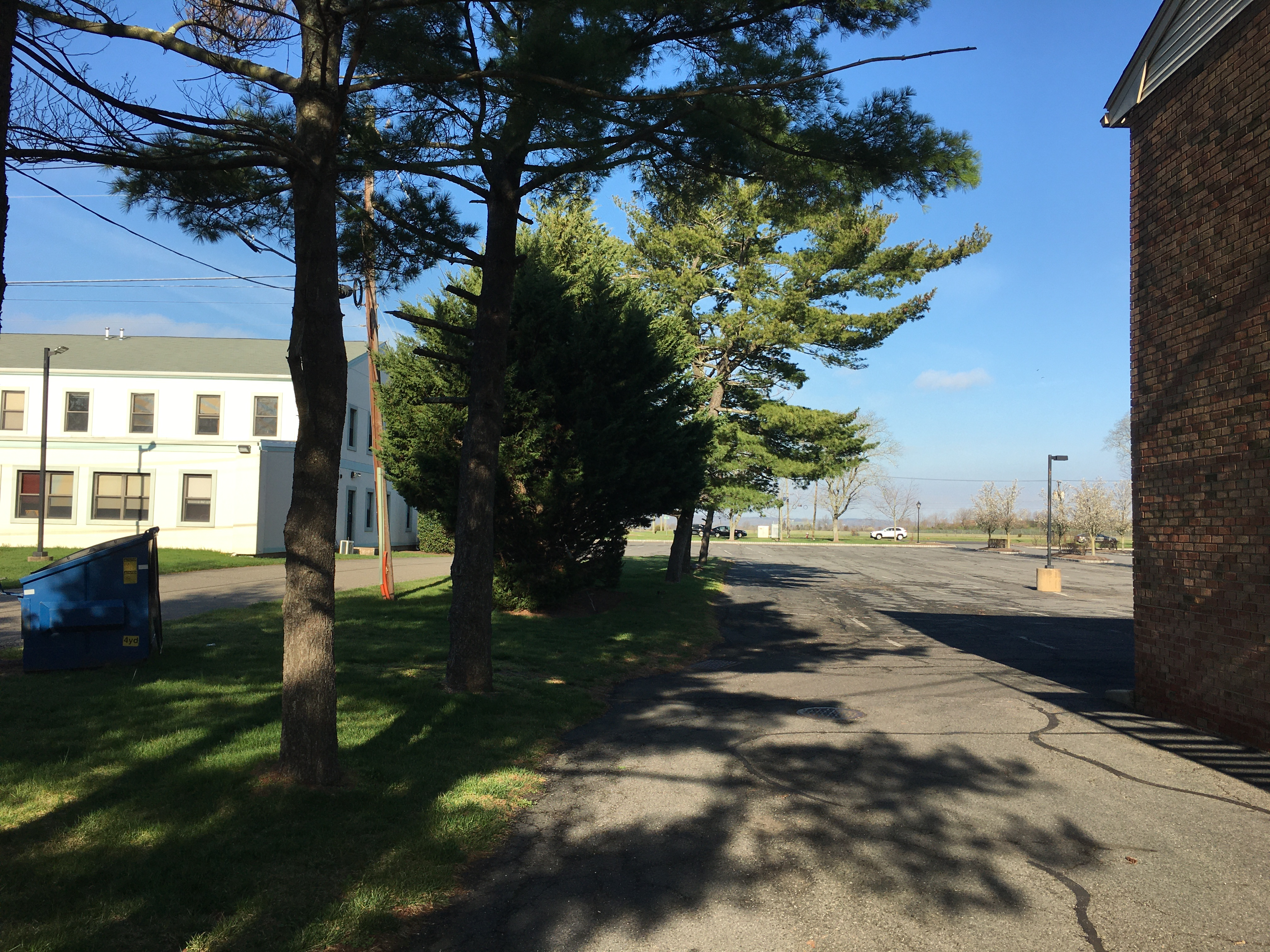
During the 1960s, ADR had a data center on this ground across Route 206 from Princeton Airport

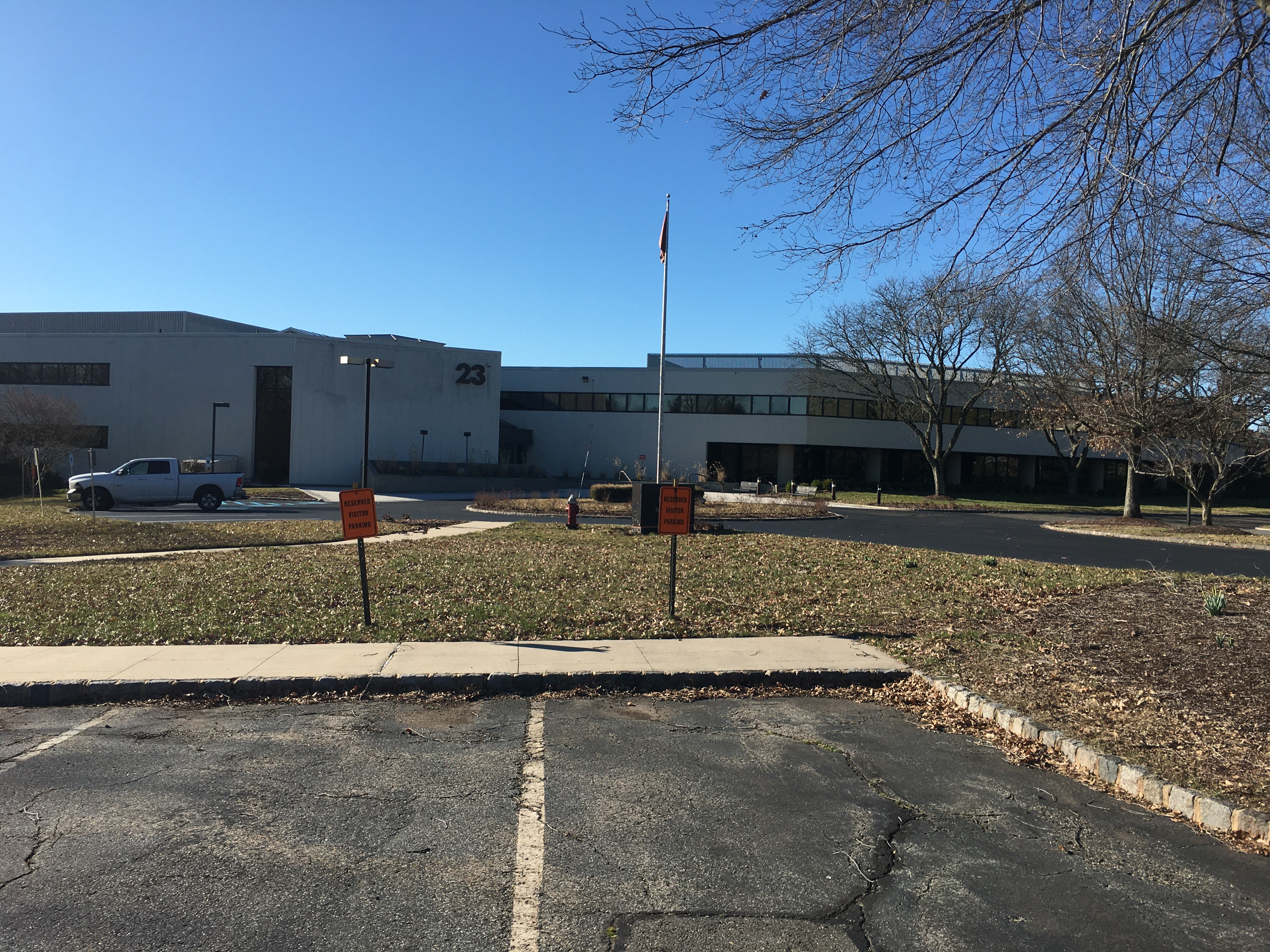
During the 1980s, ADR was headquartered in this office complex off Route 206 north of Princeton – all these as seen in 2023

== First software patent ==
ADR received the first patent issued for a computer program, a sorting system, on April 23, 1968. The program was developed by Martin Goetz. In this effort, ADR enlisted support of the Association of Data Processing Service Organizations (ADAPSO), which argued that being able to patent software innovations was vital to smaller companies being able to succeed in the market against larger companies, who would otherwise be able to imitate a product and bundle it as a free addition to their other offerings.

== ADR IBM lawsuit ==
ADR instigated litigation in Federal Court against IBM with accusations that IBM was "retarding the growth of the independent software industry" and "monopolizing the software industry", leading to IBM's famous unbundling of software and services in 1969. Legal actions against IBM also had the support of ADAPSO.

In 1970, ADR and Programmatics, a wholly owned subsidiary of ADR, received an out-of-court settlement of $1.4 million from IBM. IBM also agreed to serve as a supplier of Autoflow, which meant another potential $600,000 in revenues for ADR.

== The Librarian ==
A popular ADR product was The Librarian, a version control system for IBM mainframe operating systems. In 1978, it was reported that The Librarian was in use at over 3,000 sites; by a decade later that number had doubled.

== Vollie ==
Subsequently there was a Librarian/Online product, which depending upon its version allowed a user logged into IBM CICS to either submit a job to batch Librarian or to interactively update sources files in a split-screen interface. The Librarian/Online product was subsequently renamed Vollie, and was focused mostly on DOS/VS and DOS/VSE systems.

== Roscoe ==
Roscoe (Remote OS Conversational Operating Environment, originally marketed as ROSCOE, was a software product for IBM Mainframes. It is a text editor and also provides some operating system functionality such as the ability to submit batch jobs similar to ISPF (Note: There were capabilities available in ISPF and not in Roscoe; ditto for vice versa.) or XEDIT.

The ability to support 200+ concurrent active users and still have low overhead is based on a Single address space architecture.

The RPF (Roscoe Programming Facility) (Note: Not to be confused with another RPF, "Rob's Programming Facility ... developed by Rob Prins ... of the ING Bank in Amsterdam" systems programming group, which subsequently "stopped using ROSCOE" for system/administrative tasks.) is a scripting language with string processing capability.

== Compass ==
ADR bought Massachusetts Computer Associates, also known as Compass, in the late 1960s.

== Datacom/DB and IDEAL ==
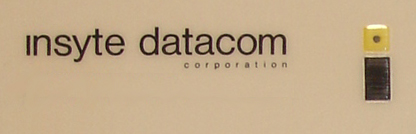
Insyte Datacom logo

ADR later purchased the Datacom/DB database management system from Insyte Datacom and developed the companion product, IDEAL (Interactive Development Environment for an Application’s Life), a fourth-generation programming language.

== Dispute with Nixdorf ==
ADR licensed DATACOM/DB to TCSC, a firm which sold modified versions of IBM's DOS/360 and DOS/VS operating systems, known as Edos. When, in 1980, Nixdorf Computer bought TCSC, Nixdorf sought to continue the licensing arrangement; ADR and NCSC went to court in a dispute over whether the licensing arrangement was terminated by the acquisition. ADR and Nixdorf settled out of court in 1981, with an agreement that Nixdorf could continue to resell ADR's products.

== Acquired, twice ==
ADR was sold to Ameritech in 1986 and was kept intact as a subsidiary.

In 1988 Ameritech sold ADR to Computer Associates (CA). Computer Associates had a reputation for mass dismissals within companies it took over; this was the case with ADR as well, as some 200 employees from the Montgomery facility were let go on the morning of October 19, 1988.

Computer Associates subsequently integrated the company into its Systems Products Division and new Information Products Division. Roscoe was marketed as CA-Roscoe, and The Librarian became known as CA Librarian.
