= Netflix =

American video streaming service

- Netflix's logo used since June 2014

- Screenshot Screenshot of Netflix's English website in September 2025
- Website type: OTT platform
- Available in: 58 languages
- List of languages: Albanian (content only); Arabic (Egyptian and Standard); Basque (content only); Bengali (content only); Bulgarian (content only); Catalan (content only); Chinese (Cantonese and Mandarin); Croatian; Czech; Danish; Dutch; English; Estonian (content only); Filipino; Finnish; Flemish (content only); French; Galician (content only); Georgian (content only); German; Greek; Hebrew; Hindi; Hungarian; Indonesian; Icelandic (content only); Irish (content only); Italian; Japanese; Kannada; Kazakh (content only); Korean; Khmer (content only); Latvian (content only); Lithuanian (content only); Malay; Malayalam; Marathi (content only); Mongolian (content only); Northern Sámi (content only); Norwegian (Bokmål); Polish; Portuguese; Romanian; Russian; Serbian (content only); Slovak (content only); Slovene (content only); Spanish; Swedish; Tamil; Telugu; Thai; Turkish; Ukrainian; Urdu (content only); Vietnamese; Welsh (content only)
- Headquarters: Los Gatos, California, US
- Country of origin: United States
- Area served: Worldwide (except China, Crimea, North Korea, Russia, and Syria)
- Industry: Entertainment; mass media
- Products: Streaming television; video on demand; digital distribution
- Services: Film production; film distribution; television production; television distribution
- Parent: Netflix, Inc.
- Website: www.netflix.com
- Commercial: Yes
- Registration: Monthly subscription required to access content
- Users: ▲325 million (as of January 20, 2026)
- Launched: April 14, 1998; 28 years ago (as a DVD e-commerce); January 16, 2007; 19 years ago (as a streaming service)
- Current status: Active
- ASN: 2906

Netflix is an American subscription video on-demand over-the-top streaming media service. The service primarily distributes original and acquired films and television shows from various genres. It is available internationally in multiple languages.

Launched in 2007, nearly a decade after Netflix, Inc. began its pioneering DVD-by-mail movie rental service, Netflix is the most-subscribed video on demand global streaming media service, with 325 million paid memberships in more than 190 countries as of 2026. By 2022, "Netflix Original" productions accounted for half of its library in the United States and the namesake company had ventured into other categories, such as video game publishing of mobile games through its flagship service. As of 2026, Netflix is the 22nd most-visited website in the world, with 20.08% of its traffic coming from the US, followed by India at 6.71%, the United Kingdom at 4.68%, and Brazil at 4.7%, according to Similarweb data. Netflix also ranked first among streaming brands in the US on Similarweb's AI visibility leaderboard for ChatGPT, with a visibility score of 86%.

== History ==
=== Launch as a mail-based rental business (1997–2006) ===
A red mailing envelope for Netflix's DVD by mail service

Netflix was founded by Marc Randolph and Reed Hastings as a DVD rental service on August 29, 1997, in Scotts Valley, California. Randolph admired Amazon and wanted to find a large category of portable items to sell over the Internet using a similar model. Hastings and Randolph considered and rejected selling and renting VHS as too expensive to stock and too delicate to ship. When they heard about DVDs, first introduced in the United States in early 1997, they tested the concept of selling or renting DVDs by mail by mailing a compact disc to Hastings's house in Santa Cruz. When the disc arrived intact, they decided to enter the $16 billion home video sales and rental industry.

On April 14, 1998, Netflix offered a per-rental model for each DVD but introduced a monthly subscription concept in September 1999, after which the per-rental model was dropped by early 2000. In 2005, 35,000 different films were available, and Netflix shipped 1 million DVDs out every day.

Through its Red Envelope Entertainment division, Netflix licensed and distributed independent films such as Born into Brothels (2004) and Sherrybaby (2006). In late 2006, Red Envelope Entertainment also expanded into producing original content with filmmakers such as John Waters. Netflix closed Red Envelope Entertainment in 2008.

=== Transition to streaming services (2007–2012) ===
Hastings reportedly told Mynette Louie in the late-1990s that his goal was always streaming media, and that Netflix rented DVDs only to grow its customer base for streaming. By the mid-2000s, data speeds and bandwidth costs improved sufficiently, allowing customers to download movies from the internet. The original idea was a "Netflix box" that could download movies overnight and be ready to watch the next day. By 2005, Netflix had acquired movie rights and designed the box and service. But after witnessing how popular streaming services such as YouTube were despite the lack of high-definition content, the concept of using a hardware device was scrapped and replaced with a streaming concept.

On January 16, 2007, the company launched a streaming media service, introducing video on demand via the Internet. However, at that time, it only had 1,000 films available for streaming, compared to 70,000 available on DVD. The service, then called "Watch Now", at first required Internet Explorer on a computer. Hollywood studios (including 20th Century Fox, Sony Pictures, MGM, Paramount Pictures, Universal Pictures, Warner Bros., New Line Cinema, and Lionsgate) licensed second-run content to the service, not expecting it to threaten their existing lucrative relationships with cable television.

In February 2007, Netflix delivered its billionth DVD, a copy of Babel (2006) to a customer in Texas. In April 2007, Netflix recruited ReplayTV founder Anthony Wood, to build a "Netflix Player" that would allow streaming content to be played directly on a television rather than a desktop or laptop. Hastings eventually shut down the project to help encourage other hardware manufacturers to include built-in Netflix support, which would be spun off as the digital media player product Roku.

In January 2008, all rental-disc subscribers became entitled to unlimited streaming at no additional cost. This change came in response to the introduction of Hulu and to Apple's new video-rental services. In August 2008, the Netflix database was corrupted and the company was unable to ship DVDs to customers for three days, leading the company to move all its data to the Amazon Web Services cloud. In November 2008, Netflix began offering subscribers rentals on Blu-ray and discontinued its sale of used DVDs. In 2009, Netflix streams overtook its DVD shipments.

In January 2010, Netflix agreed with Warner Bros. to delay new release rentals to 28 days after the DVDs became available for sale, in an attempt to help studios sell physical copies, and similar deals involving Universal Pictures and 20th Century Fox were reached on April 9. In February 2010, Netflix signed a deal to stream 300 indie movie titles. In July 2010, Netflix signed a deal to stream movies of Relativity Media. It also announced an expansion of its deal with Warner Bros. Television adding more shows, including Veronica Mars and Nip/Tuck. In August 2010, Netflix reached a five-year deal worth nearly $1 billion to stream films from Paramount, Lionsgate, and Metro-Goldwyn-Mayer. The deal increased Netflix's annual spending fees, adding roughly $200 million per year. It spent $117 million in the first six months of 2010 on streaming, up from $31 million in 2009. In September 2010, Netflix launched in Canada, its first international market. In November 2010, Netflix began offering a standalone streaming service separate from DVD rentals.

In 2010, Netflix acquired the rights to Breaking Bad, produced by Sony Pictures Television, after the show's third season, at a point where original broadcaster AMC had expressed the possibility of canceling the show. Sony pushed Netflix to release Breaking Bad in time for the fourth season, which as a result, greatly expanded the show's audience on AMC due to new viewers binging on past episodes via Netflix, and doubling its viewership by the time of the fifth season. Breaking Bad is considered the first show to have this "Netflix effect".

In January 2011, Netflix announced agreements with several manufacturers to include branded Netflix buttons on the remote controls of devices compatible with the service, such as Blu-ray players. By May 2011, Netflix had become the largest source of Internet streaming traffic in North America, accounting for 30% of traffic during peak hours.

In July 2011, Netflix announced it would be separating its existing subscription plans into two: one covering the streaming and the other DVD rental services. The cost for streaming would be $7.99 per month, while DVD rental would start at the same price. In September 2011, Netflix expanded to countries in Latin America. That same month, Netflix announced its intentions to rebrand and restructure its DVD home media rental service as an independent subsidiary called Qwikster, separating DVD rental and streaming services. Customers reacted negatively, seeing this as a price increase and a betrayal of customer loyalty. Netflix's stock value dropped, and 800,000 of its 12 million customers cancelled their subscriptions. Netflix quickly apologized, and in October 2011, announced it would retain its DVD service under the name Netflix and that its streaming and DVD-rental plans would remain branded together.

On September 26, 2011, Netflix announced a content deal with DreamWorks Animation.

In October 2011, Netflix and The CW signed a multi-year output deal for its television shows. In January 2012, Netflix started its expansion to Europe, launching in the UK and Ireland. In February 2012, Netflix reached a multi-year agreement with The Weinstein Company. In March 2012, Netflix acquired the domain name DVD.com. By 2016, Netflix rebranded its DVD-by-mail service under the name DVD.com, A Netflix Company. In April 2012, Netflix filed with the Federal Election Commission (FEC) to form a political action committee (PAC) called FLIXPAC. Netflix spokesperson Joris Evers tweeted that the intent was to "engage on issues like net neutrality, bandwidth caps, UBB and VPPA". In June 2012, Netflix signed a deal with Open Road Films.

In August 2012, Netflix and The Weinstein Company signed a multi-year output deal for RADiUS-TWC films. In September 2012, Epix signed a five-year streaming deal with Netflix. For the initial two years of this agreement, first-run and back-catalog content from Epix was exclusive to Netflix. Epix films came to Netflix 90 days after premiering on Epix. These included films from Paramount, Metro-Goldwyn-Mayer, and Lionsgate.

In October 2012, Netflix launched in Denmark, Finland, Norway, and Sweden. In December 2012, Netflix and Disney announced an exclusive multi-year agreement for first-run US subscription television rights to Walt Disney Studios' animated and live-action films, with classics such as Dumbo (1941), Alice in Wonderland (1951), and Pocahontas (1995) available immediately and others available on Netflix beginning in 2016. Direct-to-video releases were made available in 2013.

In January 2013, Netflix signed an agreement with Time Warner's Turner Broadcasting System and Warner Bros. Television to distribute Cartoon Network, Warner Bros. Animation, and Adult Swim content, as well as TNT's Dallas, beginning in March 2013. The rights to these programs were given to Netflix shortly after deals with Viacom to stream Nickelodeon and Nick Jr. Channel programs expired.

For cost reasons, Netflix stated it would limit its expansion in 2013, adding only one new market—the Netherlands—in September of that year. This expanded its availability to 40 territories.

=== Development of original programming and distribution expansion (2013–2017) ===
Netflix had long closely analyzed its customers' preferences. Watch Now gave the company real-time data on their behavior, such as scenes that customers replayed or skipped, or when they stopped watching a show. In 2011, Netflix began its efforts into original content development. In March, it made a straight-to-series order from MRC for the political drama House of Cards, led by Kevin Spacey, outbidding American cable networks. This marked the first instance of a first-run television series being specifically commissioned by the service. Netflix executives said that its customers' love of films by Spacey and show director David Fincher caused the company to acquire the show. Customers' tendency to binge watch many episodes without stopping caused it to release all 13 episodes of the show's first season at the same time. In November the same year, Netflix added two more significant productions to its roster: the comedy-drama Orange Is the New Black (OITNB), adapted from Piper Kerman's memoir, and a new season of the previously canceled Fox sitcom Arrested Development. Netflix acquired the American rights to the Norwegian drama Lilyhammer after its television premiere on Norway's NRK1 in January 2012. Notably departing from the traditional broadcast television model of weekly episode premieres, Netflix chose to release the entire first season on February 8 of the same year.

House of Cards was released by Netflix on February 1, 2013, marketed as the first "Netflix Original" production. Later that month, Netflix announced an agreement with DreamWorks Animation to commission children's television series based on its properties, beginning with Turbo Fast, a spin-off of its film Turbo (2013). OITNB would premiere in July 2013; Netflix stated that OITNB had been its most-watched original series so far, with all of them having "an audience comparable with successful shows on cable and broadcast TV."

In March 2013, Netflix added a Facebook sharing feature, letting American subscribers access "Watched by your friends" and "Friends' Favorites" by agreeing. This was not legal until the Video Privacy Protection Act was modified in early 2013. In August 2013, Netflix reintroduced the "Profiles" feature that permits accounts to house up to five user profiles.

In November 2013, Marvel Television and ABC Studios announced Netflix had ordered a slate of four television series based on the Marvel Comics characters Daredevil, Jessica Jones, Iron Fist, and Luke Cage. Each of the four series received an initial order of 13 episodes, and Netflix also ordered a Defenders miniseries that would tie them together. Daredevil and Jessica Jones premiered in 2015. The Luke Cage series premiered in September 2016, followed by Iron Fist in March 2017, and The Defenders in August 2017. Marvel owner Disney later entered into other content agreements with Netflix, including acquiring its animated Star Wars series Star Wars: The Clone Wars, and a new sixth season.

Audio logo
Netflix's audio logo, used since 2014

In February 2014, Netflix began to enter into agreements with American internet service providers, beginning with Comcast (whose customers had repeatedly complained of frequent buffering when streaming Netflix), to provide the service a direct connection to their networks. In April 2014, Netflix signed Arrested Development creator Mitchell Hurwitz and his production firm The Hurwitz Company to a multi-year deal to create original projects for the service. In May 2014, Netflix and Sony Pictures Animation had a major multi-deal to acquire streaming rights to produce films. It also began to introduce an updated logo, with a flatter appearance and updated typography.

In September 2014, Netflix expanded into six new European markets, including Austria, Belgium, France, Germany, Luxembourg, and Switzerland. On September 10, 2014, Netflix participated in Internet Slowdown Day by deliberately slowing down its speed in support of net neutrality regulations in the US. In October 2014, Netflix announced a four-film deal with Adam Sandler and his Happy Madison Productions.

In April 2015, following the launch of Daredevil, Netflix director of content operations Tracy Wright announced that Netflix had added support for audio description, and had begun to work with its partners to add descriptions to its other original series over time. The following year, as part of a settlement with the American Council of the Blind, Netflix agreed to provide descriptions for its original series within 30 days of their premiere, and add screen reader support and the ability to browse content by availability of descriptions.

In March 2015, Netflix expanded to Australia and New Zealand. In September 2015, Netflix launched in Japan, its first country in Asia. In October 2015, Netflix launched in Italy, Portugal, and Spain.

In January 2016, at the Consumer Electronics Show, Netflix announced a major international expansion of its service into 130 additional countries, making it available worldwide except in China, Syria, North Korea, Kosovo, and Crimea. As part of this expansion, Netflix officially launched its services in Africa, with a focus on South Africa, Kenya, and Nigeria. Between 2018 and 2020, Netflix had started making significant investments in African storytelling, and hired Dorothy Ghettuba, a Kenyan media entrepreneur, as head of African Originals. According to the company, it has invested the equivalent of €160 million in film content production in Africa since it began working on the continent in 2016, with over 12,000 jobs created across Nigeria, Kenya, and South Africa.

In April 2016, Hastings stated that the company planned to expand its in-house, Los Angeles-based Netflix Studios to grow its output; Hastings ruled out any potential acquisitions of existing studios. In May 2016, Netflix created a tool called Fast.com to determine the speed of an Internet connection. It received praise for being "simple" and "easy to use", and does not include online advertising, unlike competitors. In November 2016, Netflix launched an offline playback feature, allowing users of the Netflix mobile apps on Android or iOS to cache content on their devices in standard or high quality for viewing offline, without an Internet connection. Netflix released an estimated 30 original series or films over that year, more than any network or cable channel.

In February 2017, Netflix signed a music publishing deal with BMG Rights Management, whereby BMG would oversee rights outside of the US for music associated with Netflix Original content. Netflix continues to handle these tasks in-house in the US. In April 2017, Netflix signed a licensing deal with IQIYI, a Chinese video streaming platform owned by Baidu, to allow selected Netflix Original content to be distributed in China on the platform.

In August 2017, Netflix acquired Millarworld, the creator-owned publishing company of comic book writer Mark Millar. The purchase marked the first corporate acquisition to have been made by Netflix. That same month, Netflix entered into an exclusive development deal with Shonda Rhimes and her production company Shondaland.

In September 2017, Netflix announced it would offer its low-broadband mobile technology to airlines to provide better in-flight Wi-Fi so passengers could watch movies on Netflix while on planes. That same month, Minister of Heritage Mélanie Joly announced that Netflix had agreed to make a CA$500 million (US$400 million) investment over the next five years in producing content in Canada. The company denied that the deal was intended to result in a tax break. Netflix realized this goal by December 2018.

In October 2017, Netflix iterated a goal of having half of its library consist of original content by 2019, announcing a plan to invest $8 billion on original content in 2018. In October 2017, Netflix introduced the "Skip Intro" feature, which allows customers to skip the intros to shows on its platform through a variety of techniques including manual reviewing, audio tagging, and machine learning.

In November 2017, Netflix signed an exclusive multi-year deal with Orange Is the New Black creator Jenji Kohan. That same month, Netflix withdrew from co-hosting a party at the 75th Golden Globe Awards with The Weinstein Company due to the Harvey Weinstein sexual abuse cases.

=== Expansion into international productions and new productions, Co-CEOs (2017–2020) ===
Icon used since 2016

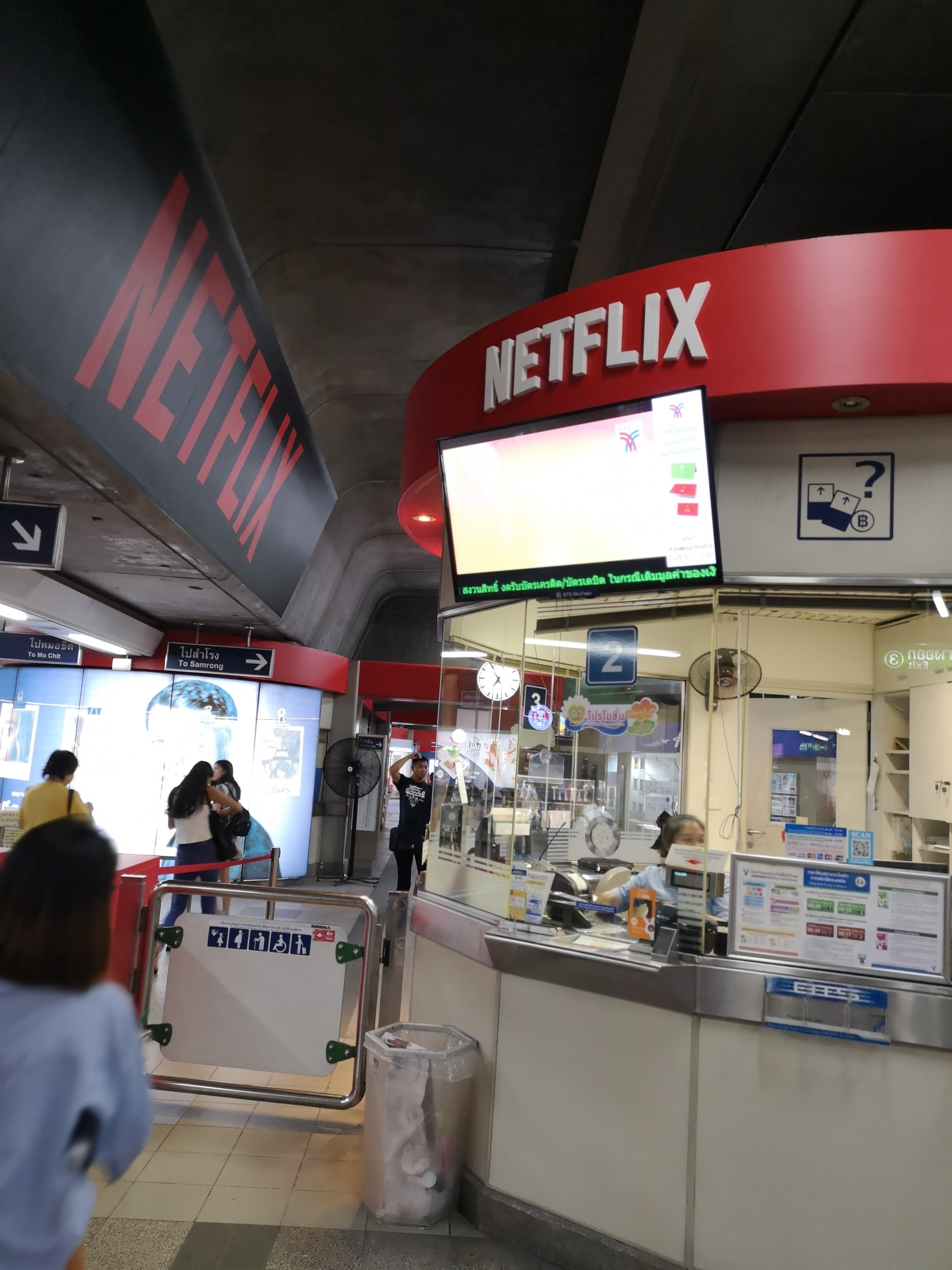
Netflix advertising at Thong Lo BTS station, Bangkok

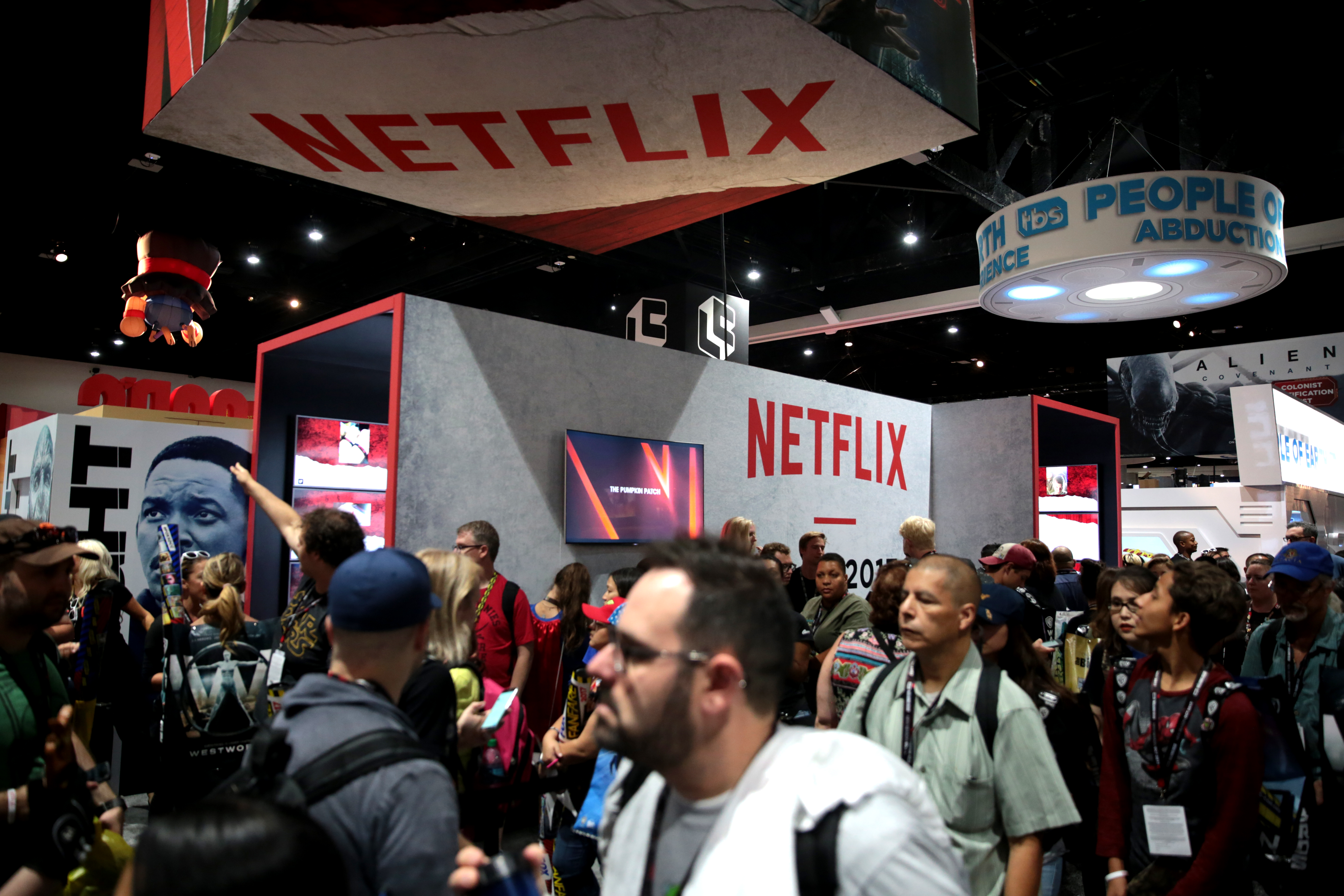
Netflix's booth at the 2017 San Diego Comic-Con

In November 2017, Netflix announced it would be making its first original Colombian series, to be executive produced by Ciro Guerra. In December 2017, Netflix signed Stranger Things director-producer Shawn Levy and his production company 21 Laps Entertainment to what sources say is a four-year deal. In 2017, Netflix invested in distributing exclusive stand-up comedy specials from Dave Chappelle, Louis C.K., Chris Rock, Jim Gaffigan, Bill Burr, and Jerry Seinfeld.

In February 2018, Netflix acquired the rights to The Cloverfield Paradox (2018) from Paramount Pictures for $50 million and launched it on February 4, 2018, shortly after airing its first trailer during Super Bowl LII. Analysts believed that Netflix's purchase of the film helped to make the film instantly profitable for Paramount compared to a more traditional theatrical release, while Netflix benefited from the surprise reveal. Other films acquired by Netflix include international distribution for Paramount's Annihilation (2018) and Universal's News of the World (2020) and worldwide distribution of Universal's Extinction (2018), Warner Bros.' Mowgli: Legend of the Jungle (2018), Paramount's The Lovebirds (2020) and 20th Century Studios' The Woman in the Window (2021). In March, the service ordered Formula 1: Drive to Survive, a racing docuseries following teams in the Formula One world championship.

In March 2018, Sky UK announced an agreement with Netflix to integrate Netflix's subscription VOD offering into its pay-TV service. Customers with its high-end Sky Q set-top box and service will be able to see Netflix titles alongside their regular Sky channels. In October 2022, Netflix revealed that its annual revenue from the UK subscribers in 2021 was £1.4bn.

In April 2018, Netflix pulled out of the Cannes Film Festival, in response to new rules requiring competition films to have been released in French theaters. The Cannes premiere of Okja in 2017 was controversial, and led to discussions over the appropriateness of films with simultaneous digital releases being screened at an event showcasing theatrical film; audience members also booed the Netflix production logo at the screening. Netflix's attempts to negotiate to allow a limited release in France were curtailed by organizers, as well as French cultural exception law—where theatrically screened films are legally forbidden from being made available via video-on-demand services until at least 36 months after their release. Besides traditional Hollywood markets as well as from partners like the BBC, Sarandos said the company was also looking to expand investments in non-traditional foreign markets due to the growth of viewers outside of North America. At the time, this included programs such as Dark from Germany, Ingobernable from Mexico, and 3% from Brazil.

In May 2018, former president, Barack Obama, and his wife, Michelle Obama, signed a deal to produce docuseries, documentaries, and features for Netflix under the Obamas' newly formed production company, Higher Ground Productions.

In June 2018, Netflix announced a partnership with Telltale Games to port its adventure games to the service in a streaming video format, allowing simple controls through a television remote. The first game, Minecraft: Story Mode, was released in November 2018. In July 2018, Netflix earned the most Emmy nominations of any network for the first time with 112 nods. In August 2018, the company signed a five-year exclusive overall deal with international best-selling author Harlan Coben. At the same time, the company signed an overall deal with Gravity Falls creator Alex Hirsch. In October 2018, Netflix paid under $30 million to acquire Albuquerque Studios (ABQ Studios), a $91 million film and TV production facility with eight sound stages in Albuquerque, New Mexico, for its first US production hub, pledging to spend over $1 billion over the next decade to create one of the largest film studios in North America. In November 2018, Paramount Pictures signed a multi-picture film deal with Netflix, making Paramount the first major film studio to do so. A sequel to AwesomenessTV's To All the Boys I've Loved Before (2018) was released on Netflix under the title To All the Boys: P.S. I Still Love You (2020) as part of the agreement. In December 2018, the company announced a partnership with ESPN Films on a television documentary chronicling Michael Jordan and the 1997–98 Chicago Bulls season titled The Last Dance. It was released internationally on Netflix and became available for streaming in the US three months after a broadcast airing on ESPN.

In January 2019, Sex Education made its debut as a Netflix Original series, receiving much critical acclaim. On January 22, 2019, Netflix sought and was approved for membership into the Motion Picture Association of America (MPAA), making it the first streaming service to join the association. In February 2019, The Haunting creator Mike Flanagan joined frequent collaborator Trevor Macy as a partner in Intrepid Pictures, and the duo signed an exclusive deal with Netflix to produce television content. In March 2019, Netflix entered a partnership with Japanese anime studio David Production. “Netflix aims to be the most compelling and attractive home for anime fans, creators and production studios. We are creating an environment where production houses can do their best work, and deliver their shows on a service where we connect anime fans from over 190 countries to content they love” said Netflix Director of Content (Japan), John Derderian. In May 2019, Netflix contracted with Dark Horse Entertainment to make television series and films based on comics from Dark Horse Comics. In July 2019, Netflix announced it would be opening a hub at Shepperton Studios as part of a deal with Pinewood Group. In early-August 2019, Netflix negotiated an exclusive multi-year film and television deal with Game of Thrones creators and showrunners David Benioff and D.B. Weiss. The first Netflix production created by Benioff and Weiss was planned as an adaptation of Liu Cixin's science fiction novel The Three-Body Problem, part of the Remembrance of Earth's Past trilogy. In September 2019, in addition to renewing Stranger Things for a fourth season, Netflix signed The Duffer Brothers to an overall deal covering future film and television projects for the service.

In November 2019, Netflix and Nickelodeon entered into a multi-year agreement to produce several original animated feature films and television series based on Nickelodeon's library of characters. This agreement expanded on their existing relationship, in which new specials based on the past Nickelodeon series Invader Zim and Rocko's Modern Life (Invader Zim: Enter the Florpus and Rocko's Modern Life: Static Cling, respectively) were released by Netflix. Other new projects planned under the team-up include a music project featuring Squidward Tentacles from the animated television series SpongeBob SquarePants, and films based on The Loud House and Rise of the Teenage Mutant Ninja Turtles. The agreement with Disney ended in 2019 due to the launch of Disney+, with its Marvel productions moving exclusively to the service in 2022. Also in November 2019, Netflix announced it had signed a long-term lease to save the Paris Theatre, the last single-screen movie theater in Manhattan. The company oversaw several renovations at the theater, including new seats and a concession stand.

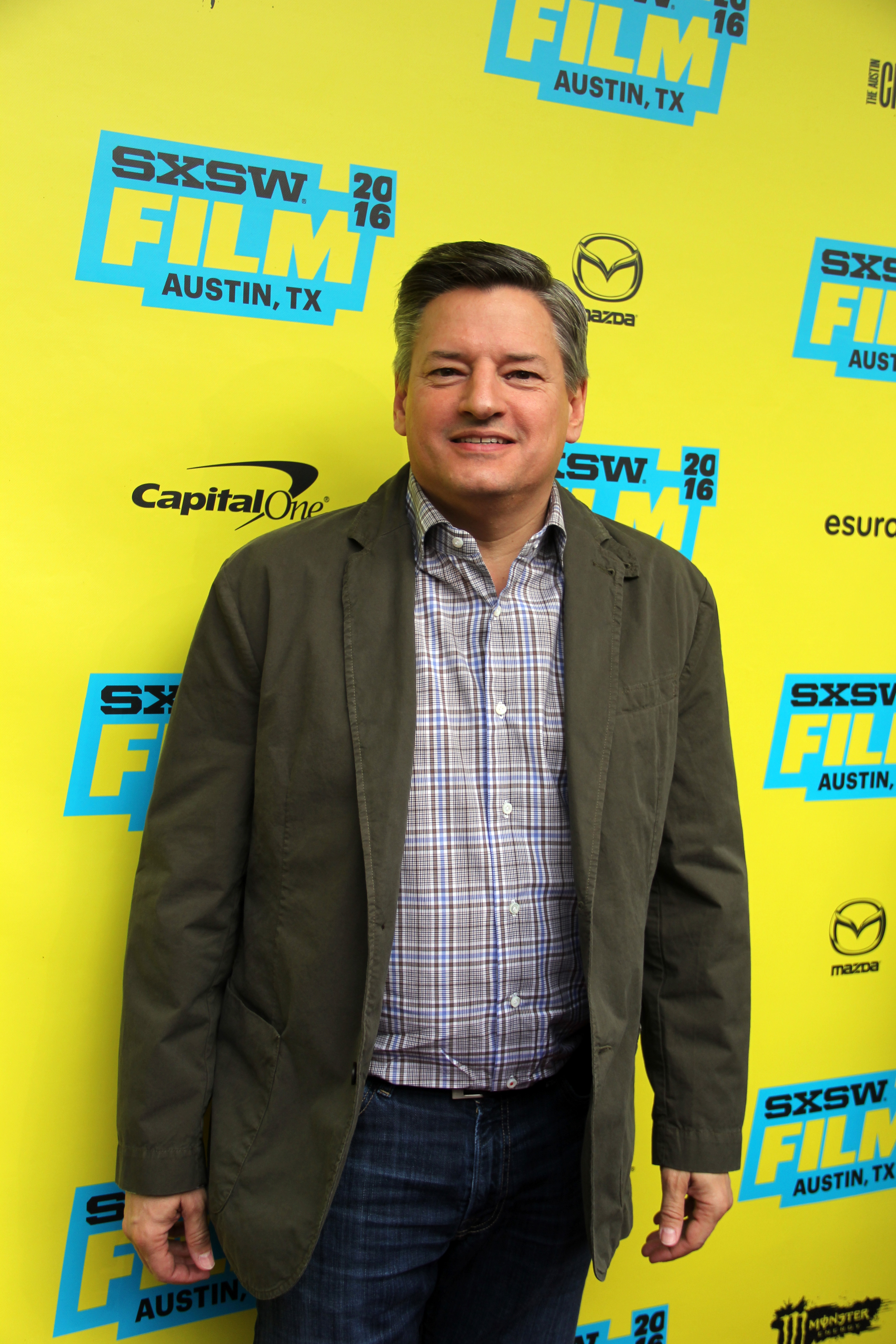
Ted Sarandos, longtime CCO and named co-CEO in 2020

In January 2020, Netflix announced a new four-film deal with Adam Sandler worth up to $275 million. In February 2020, Netflix formed partnerships with six Japanese creators to produce an original Japanese anime project. This partnership includes manga creator group CLAMP, manga creator Shin Kibayashi, manga creator Yasuo Ohtagaki, novelist and film director Otsuichi, novelist Tow Ubukata, and manga creator Mari Yamazaki. In March 2020, ViacomCBS announced it will be producing two spin-off films based on SpongeBob SquarePants for Netflix. In April 2020, Peter Chernin's Chernin Entertainment made a multi-year first-look deal with Netflix to make films. In May 2020, Netflix announced the acquisition of Grauman's Egyptian Theatre from the American Cinematheque to use as a special events venue. In July 2020, Netflix appointed Sarandos as co-CEO. That same month, Netflix invested in Black Mirror creators Charlie Brooker and Annabel Jones' new production outfit Broke And Bones.

In September 2020, Netflix signed a multi-million dollar deal with the Duke and Duchess of Sussex. Harry and Meghan agreed to a multi-year deal promising to create TV shows, films, and children's content as part of their commitment to stepping away from the duties of the royal family. That same month, Hastings released a book about Netflix culture titled No Rules Rules: Netflix and the Culture of Reinvention, which was coauthored by Erin Meyer. In December 2020, Netflix signed a first-look deal with Millie Bobby Brown to develop and star in several projects, including a potential action franchise.

=== Expansion into gaming, Squid Game, new programing, and new initiatives (2021–2022) ===
In March 2021, Netflix earned the most Academy Award nominations of any studio, with 36 nods. Netflix won seven Academy Awards, which was the most by any studio. Later that year, Netflix also won more Emmys than any other network or studio with 44 wins, tying the record for most Emmys won in a single year set by CBS in 1974.

In April 2021, Sony Pictures Entertainment announced an agreement for Netflix to hold the US pay television window rights to its releases beginning in 2022, replacing Starz and expanding upon an existing agreement with Sony Pictures Animation. The agreement also includes a first-look deal for any future direct-to-streaming films being produced by Sony Pictures, with Netflix required to commit to a minimum number of them. On April 27, Netflix announced it was opening its first Canadian headquarters in Toronto. The company also announced that it would open an office in Sweden, Rome, and Istanbul to increase its original content in those regions.

In early-June, Netflix hosted a first-ever week-long virtual event called "Geeked Week", where it shared exclusive news, new trailers, cast appearances, and more about upcoming genre titles like The Witcher, The Cuphead Show!, and The Sandman. On June 7, Jennifer Lopez's Nuyorican Productions signed a multi-year first-look deal with Netflix spanning feature films, TV series, and unscripted content, with an emphasis on projects that support diverse female actors, writers, and filmmakers. On June 10, Netflix announced it was launching an online store for curated products tied to the Netflix brand and shows such as Stranger Things and The Witcher. On June 21, Steven Spielberg's Amblin Partners signed a deal with Netflix to release multiple new feature films for the streaming service. On June 30, Powerhouse Animation Studios (the studio behind Netflix's Castlevania) announced signing a first-look deal with the streamer to produce more animated series.

In July 2021, Netflix hired Mike Verdu, a former executive from Electronic Arts and Facebook, as vice president of game development, along with plans to add video games by 2022. Netflix announced plans to release mobile games that would be included in subscribers' service plans. Trial offerings were first launched for Netflix users in Poland in August 2021, offering premium mobile games based on Stranger Things, including Stranger Things 3: The Game, for free to subscribers through the Netflix mobile app. On July 14, 2021, Netflix signed a first-look deal with Joey King, star of The Kissing Booth franchise, in which King would produce and develop films for Netflix via her All The King's Horses production company. On July 21, Zack Snyder, director of Netflix's Army of the Dead, announced he had signed his production company The Stone Quarry to a first-look deal with Netflix; his upcoming projects included a sequel to Army of the Dead and a sci-fi adventure film titled Rebel Moon. In 2019, he had agreed to produce an anime-style web series inspired by Norse mythology.

As of August 2021, Netflix Originals made up 40% of Netflix's overall library in the US. The company announced that "TUDUM: A Netflix Global Fan Event", a three-hour virtual behind the scenes featuring first-look reveals for 100 of the streamer's series, films, and specials, would have its inaugural show in late September 2021. According to Netflix, the show garnered 25.7 million views across Netflix's 29 Netflix YouTube channels, Twitter, Twitch, Facebook, TikTok, and Tudum.com.

Also in September, the company announced The Queen's Ball: A Bridgerton Experience, an immersive, Regency-era ball, launching in 2022 in Los Angeles, Chicago, Montreal, and Washington, D.C. Then Squid Game, a South Korean survival drama created and produced by Hwang Dong-hyuk, rapidly became the service's most-watched show within a week of its launch in many markets on September 17, 2021, including Korea, the US, and the UK. Within its first 28 days on the service, Squid Game drew more than 111 million viewers, surpassing Bridgerton and becoming Netflix's most-watched show. On September 20, Netflix signed a long-term lease with Aviva Investors to operate and expand the Longcross Studios in Surrey, UK. On September 21, Netflix announced it would acquire the Roald Dahl Story Company, which manages the rights to Roald Dahl's stories and characters, for an undisclosed price and would operate it as an independent company. The company acquired Night School Studio, an independent video game developer, on September 28.

On October 13, 2021, Netflix announced the launch of the Netflix Book Club, partnering with Starbucks for a social series called But Have You Read the Book?. Uzo Aduba became inaugural host of the series and announced monthly book selections set to be adapted by the streamer. Aduba speaks with the cast, creators, and authors about the book adaptation process over a cup of coffee at Starbucks. Through October 2021, Netflix commonly reported viewership for its programming based on the number of viewers or households that watched a show in a given period (such as the first 28 days from its premiere) for at least two minutes. On the announcement of its quarterly earnings in October 2021, the company stated that it would switch its viewership metrics to measuring the number of hours that a show was watched, including rewatches, which the company said was closer to the measurements used in linear broadcast television, and thus "our members and the industry can better measure success in the streaming world."

Netflix officially launched mobile games on November 2, 2021, for Android users around the world. Through the app, subscribers had free access to five games, including two previously made Stranger Things titles. Netflix intends to add more games to this service over time. On November 9, the collection launched for iOS. Some games in the collection require an active internet connection to play, while others will be available offline. Netflix Kids' accounts will not have games available. On November 16, Netflix announced the launch of "Top10 on Netflix.com", a new website with weekly global and country lists of the most popular titles on its service based on its new viewership metrics. On November 22, Netflix announced that it would acquire Scanline VFX, the visual effects and animation company behind Cowboy Bebop and Stranger Things. On the same day, Roberto Patino signed a deal with Netflix and established his production banner, Analog Inc., in partnership with the company. Patino's first project under the deal is a series adaptation of Image Comics' Nocterra.

On December 6, 2021, Netflix and Stage 32 announced that they have teamed up the workshops at the Creating Content for the Global Marketplace program. On December 7, 2021, Netflix partnered with IllumiNative, a woman-led non-profit organization, for the Indigenous Producers Training Program. On December 9, Netflix announced the launch of "Tudum", an official companion website that offers news, exclusive interviews and behind-the-scenes videos for its original television shows and films. On December 13, Netflix signed a multi-year overall deal with Kalinda Vazquez. On December 16, Netflix signed a multi-year creative partnership with Spike Lee and his production company 40 Acres and a Mule Filmworks to develop film and television projects.

In compliance with the EU Audiovisual Media Services Directive and its implementation in France, Netflix reached commitments with French broadcasting authorities and film guilds, as required by law, to invest a specific amount of its annual revenue into original French films and series. These films must be theatrically released and would not be allowed to be carried on Netflix until 15 months after their release.

In January 2022, Netflix ordered additional sports docuseries from Drive to Survive producers Box to Box Films, including a series that would follow PGA Tour golfers (Full Swing), and another that would follow professional tennis players (Break Point).

The company announced plans to acquire Next Games in March 2022 for €65 million as part of Netflix's expansions into gaming. Next Games had developed the mobile title Stranger Things: Puzzle Tales as well as two The Walking Dead mobile games. Later that month, Netflix also acquired the Texas-based mobile game developer, Boss Fight Entertainment, for an undisclosed sum.

In March 2022, Netflix announced a partnership with Dr. Seuss Enterprises to produce five new series and specials based on Seuss properties following the success of Green Eggs and Ham. On March 29, Netflix announced it would open an office in Poland to serve as a hub for its original productions across Central and Eastern Europe. On March 30, Netflix extended its lease agreement with Martini Film Studios, just outside Vancouver, Canada, for another five years. On March 31, Netflix ordered a docuseries that would follow teams in the 2022 Tour de France, which would also be co-produced by Box to Box Films.

Following the 2022 Russian invasion of Ukraine, Netflix suspended its operations and future projects in Russia. It also announced that it would not comply with a proposed directive by Roskomnadzor requiring all internet streaming services with more than 100,000 subscribers to integrate the major free-to-air channels (which are primarily state-owned). A month later, ex-Russian subscribers filed a class action lawsuit against Netflix.

In April 2022, Netflix stated that 100 million households globally were sharing passwords to their account with others, and that Canada and the US accounted for 30 million of them. Following these announcements, Netflix's stock price fell by 35%. By June 2022, Netflix had laid off 450 full-time and contract employees as part of the company's plan to trim costs amid lower than expected subscriber growth. In October 2026, Netflix announced it would cut around 1,000 jobs, about 6% of its workforce. It has been reported that most of the layoffs would affect employees in product, technology, legal and human resources, making it the company's largest round of job cuts since 2022.

On April 13, 2022, Netflix released the series Our Great National Parks, which was hosted and narrated by former US President Barack Obama. It also partnered with Group Effort Initiative, a company founded by Ryan Reynolds and Blake Lively, to provide opportunities behind the camera for those in underrepresented communities. On the same day, Netflix partnered with Lebanon-based Arab Fund For Arts And Culture for supporting the Arab female filmmakers. It would provide a one-time grant of $250,000 to female producers and directors in the Arab world through the company's Fund for Creative Equity. Also on the same day, Netflix announced an Exploding Kittens mobile card game tied to a new animated TV series, which would launch in May. Netflix formed a creative partnership with J. Miles Dale. The company also formed a partnership with Japan's Studio Colorido, signing a multi-film deal to boost its anime content in Asia. The streaming giant is said to co-produce three feature films with the studio, the first of which would premiere in September 2022. On April 28, the company launched its inaugural Netflix Is a Joke comedy festival, featuring more than 250 shows over 12 nights at 30-plus locations across Los Angeles, including the first-ever stand-up show at Dodger Stadium.

The first volume of Stranger Things 4 logged Netflix's biggest premiere weekend ever for an original series with 286.79 million hours viewed. This was preceded by a new Stranger Things interactive experience hosted in New York City that was developed by the show's creators. After the release of the second volume of Stranger Things 4 on July 1, 2022, it became Netflix's second title to receive more than one billion hours viewed. On July 19, 2022, Netflix announced plans to acquire Australian animation studio Animal Logic. Also that month, in collaboration with Sennheiser, Netflix began to add Ambeo 2-channel audio mixes (referred to as "spatial audio") to selected original productions, which allows simulated surround sound on stereo speakers and headphones.

In September 2022, Netflix opened an office in Warsaw, Poland, responsible for the service's operations in 28 markets in Central and Eastern Europe.

In October 2022, Netflix signed a creative partnership with Andrea Berloff and John Gatins. On October 11, Netflix signed up with the Broadcasters' Audience Research Board for external measurement of viewership in the UK. On October 12, Netflix signed to build a production complex at Fort Monmouth in Eatontown, New Jersey. On October 18, Netflix began exploring a cloud gaming offering and opened a new gaming studio in Southern California.

In November 2022, Netflix announced a strategic partnership with The Seven, a Japanese production company owned by TBS Holdings, to produce multiple original live-action titles over the next five years. In December 2022, Netflix announced that 60% of its subscribers had watched a Korean drama. CEO Ted Sarandos attributed the increase in viewership of Korean content among Americans to Korean films and dramas being "often unpredictable" and catching "the American audience by surprise".

Inn January 2023, Netflix announced plans to open an engineering hub in its Warsaw office to provide Netflix's creative partners with software solutions for the production of films and series. In February 2023, Netflix launched a wider rollout of spatial audio, and began allowing Premium subscribers to download content for offline playback on up to six devices (expanded from four).

In March 2023, Netflix broadcast its first-ever global live-streaming event, the stand-up comedy special Chris Rock: Selective Outrage.

Netflix reworked its viewership metrics again in June 2023. Viewership of shows was measured during the first 91 days of availability, instead of the first 28 days, and are now based on the total viewership hours divided by the total hours of the show itself. This provided more equal considerations for shorter shows and movies compared to longer ones.

In August 2023, the company announced Netflix Stories, a collection of interactive narrative games from Netflix series and movies such as Love is Blind, Money Heist, and Virgin River.

=== Discontinuation of DVD-by-mail, expansion of live events and venues, WWE (2023–present) ===
In January 2023, Hastings stepped down from his role as co-CEO and assumed the role of executive chairman. He was replaced by Greg Peters, who joined Ted Sarandos as co-CEOs of Netflix. Peters previously served as Chief Operating Officer (COO) and Chief Product Officer (CPO), while Sarandos served as Chief Content Officer (CCO).

In April 2023, Netflix announced it would discontinue its DVD-by-mail service on September 29. Users of the service were able to keep the DVDs they had received. Over its lifetime, the service had sent out over 5 billion shipments.

In October 2023, Eunice Kim was promoted to CPO and Elizabeth Stone was promoted to Chief Technology Officer (CTO). That same month, amid a restructuring of its animation division, Netflix announced a multi-film agreement with Skydance Animation beginning with Spellbound (2024). The agreement partially replaces one it had with Apple TV+.

In December 2023, Netflix released its first "What We Watched: A Netflix Engagement Report", a look at viewership for every original and licensed title watched more than 50,000 hours from January to June 2023. The company also announced plans to publish the report twice a year. In its first report for the first six months of 2023, it revealed that The Night Agent was the most watched show globally during that period.

In January 2024, Netflix announced a major agreement with professional wrestling promotion WWE, under which it would acquire the rights to its live weekly program Raw beginning January 6, 2025; the rights would initially cover the US, Canada, the UK, and Latin America, and expand to other territories over time. As part of the agreement, Netflix also acquired the international rights to WWE's main weekly programs (Raw, SmackDown, and NXT) and pay-per-view events outside of the US, and the former WWE Network library of supplemental and archive content. The agreement was reported to be valued at $500 million per-year over ten years. Netflix would later acquire the library rights in the US under a separate deal, replacing an agreement with Peacock.

In February 2024, Netflix joined with Peter Morgan, creator of Netflix series The Crown, to produce the play Patriots on Broadway. The venture is the first Broadway credit for the company but not its first stage project. It was actively involved as a producer of Stranger Things: The First Shadow in London. Both productions share a lead producer, Sonia Friedman.

In May 2024, the company hosted its second Netflix Is a Joke festival in Los Angeles. It streamed several specials from the festival live, including Katt Williams's Woke Folk and The Roast of Tom Brady, both of which ranked on Netflix's global top 10 the following two weeks. That same month, Netflix announced it would stream both National Football League Christmas games in 2024. For 2025 and 2026, the streamer would have exclusive rights to at least one NFL Christmas game each year.

In June 2024, Netflix announced it would develop new entertainment venues known as "Netflix House" at the King of Prussia Mall in Pennsylvania and Galleria Dallas in Texas. The spaces would feature retail shops, restaurants, and other interactive experiences related to Netflix Original content, building upon other "pop-up" initiatives to promote individual programs. Netflix House Philadelphia would feature immersive experiences for Wednesday and One Piece, while Netflix House Dallas will feature Stranger Things: Escape the Dark and Squid Game: Survive the Trials. Netflix House Las Vegas Strip will open in 2027.

In November 2024, Netflix announced it would discontinue further work on interactive specials and remove all but four of them from the platform, citing a desire to focus on "technological efforts in other areas". On November 15, Netflix streamed a boxing event from AT&T Stadium in Arlington, Texas, featuring as co-main events an exhibition match between Jake Paul and Mike Tyson, and Katie Taylor versus Amanda Serrano for the WBA, WBC, IBF, WBO, and The Ring lightweight titles. While afflicted by technical issues, Paul's promoter reported that the stream had a peak concurrent viewership of 65 million viewers, surpassing the 2023 ICC Men's Cricket World Cup final (which had a reported 57 million concurrent streams on Disney+ Hotstar) as the most live-streamed sporting event. Netflix stated that the event had an "average minute audience" (AMA) of 108 million worldwide, and that the AMA of 47 million in the US made the Taylor versus Serrano bout the most-watched women's professional sporting event in US history.

In December 2024, FIFA announced that Netflix would be the exclusive American broadcaster of the 2027 and 2031 FIFA Women's World Cup, in what was deemed the platform's most significant push into sports content. On December 25, Netflix aired its first-ever NFL games: the Kansas City Chiefs versus the Pittsburgh Steelers, and the Baltimore Ravens versus the Houston Texans. The games both averaged over 30 million global viewers and became the two most-streamed NFL games in American history, while simultaneously creating Netflix's most-watched Christmas Day ever in the US.

In January 2025, Netflix announced it had exceeded 300 million subscribers worldwide after adding a record 18.9 million in Q4 of 2024, amounting to 41 million for the full year. In May 2025, Netflix announced a redesign of its home screen for the first time since 2013, which has a simplified appearance with more prominent metadata, and replaces the sidebar menu with a streamlined section of tabs along the top of the screen. Netflix stated that the redesign was meant to allow users to "have an easier time figuring out if a title is right for them", and be more reflective of new types of content offerings such as sports and other live events.

In August 2025, Netflix announced an exclusivity deal to stream the World Baseball Classic in Japan starting in 2026. The 2026 edition marks the first time it will stream a live event in Japan. Through this agreement, Netflix will stream all 47 games of the 2026 World Baseball Classic live and on-demand for its users in Japan. The animated musical KPop Demon Hunters (2025) became Netflix's most popular film of all time later that month.

In November 2025, Netflix acquired rights to selected Major League Baseball (MLB) events for the 2026, 2027, and 2028 seasons in the United States, including a primetime Opening Night game, the Home Run Derby during the MLB All-Star Game, and the MLB at Field of Dreams game.

On December 5, 2025, Netflix, Inc. initially won a bid to acquire Warner Bros. Discovery's studios and streaming businesses (including the Warner Bros. film, television, and video game studios, HBO/HBO Max and their respective libraries, DC Entertainment/DC Studios, and WBD's distribution and licensing divisions, but excluding its linear television networks) for $27.75 per-share (approximately $72 billion), valuing the entirety of WBD at $82.7 billion. Paramount Skydance subsequently made hostile, all-cash counter-offers for the entirety of WBD, assessing that its offer had fewer regulatory burdens and would be better for shareholders. On February 26, 2026, WBD agreed to be acquired by Paramount Skydance for $31 per-share, valuing the company at $111 billion. Netflix subsequently backed out of bidding, considering its own offer to be "no longer financially attractive". Paramount Skydance would pay Netflix a $2.8 billion breakup fee.

In late-2025, Netflix began to make shifts into podcasts, acquiring rights to exclusively carry video from selected shows from iHeartMedia, Barstool Sports, (including Pardon My Take, Spittin' Chiclets, and The Ryen Russillo Show) and The Ringer. In 2026, Netflix began to premiere its own original podcasts, including The Pete Davidson Show, The White House with Michael Irvin, Allegedly with Ellison Barber, Shut Up Evan with Evan Ross Katz, We're Back! With Brian Williams, The Puzzle Room with David Kwong, and The Rotten Files with Stephanie Soo.

In April 2026, Netflix introduced a new mobile design to make it easier to find something to watch. This new experience included "Clips", a vertical video feed featuring short clips from Netflix series, films and specials tailored to each member. In the same month, the company announced Reed Hastings would step down from its board in June of that year.

In May 2026, the company released "The Netflix Effect", outlining the impact since the company expanded to more than 190 countries in 2016. This included contributing $325 billion to the global economy, investing $135 billion in the TV and film industry, and creating 425,000 jobs. Also in May 2026, Netflix announced that the ads tier had reached 250 million monthly active viewers.

In July 2026, The Wall Street Journal reported that Netflix is exploring the introduction of live, linear TV channels and third-party streaming bundles to combat declining viewer engagement and enhance its advertising business. That same month, it was reported that Netflix was among several parties—including Sony and Paramount—in early talks to buy online film discovery platform Letterboxd.

== Content ==
=== Delivery ===
Netflix freely peers with Internet service providers (ISPs) directly and at common Internet exchange points. In June 2012, a custom content delivery network, Open Connect, was announced. For larger ISPs with over 100,000 subscribers, Netflix offers free Netflix Open Connect computer appliances that cache its content within the ISPs' data centers or networks to further reduce Internet transit costs. By August 2016, Netflix closed its last physical data center, but continued to develop its Open Connect technology. A 2016 study at the University of London detected 233 individual Open Connect locations on over six continents, with the largest amount of traffic in the US, followed by Mexico.

As of July 2017, Netflix series and movies accounted for more than a third of all prime-time download Internet traffic in North America.

=== Original programming ===
Netflix Original Movies

"Netflix Originals" are content that is produced, co-produced, or distributed exclusively by Netflix. Netflix funds its original shows differently than other TV networks when it signs a project, providing the money upfront and immediately ordering two seasons of most series. It keeps licensing rights, which normally give production companies future revenue opportunities from syndication, merchandising, etc.

Over the years, Netflix output ballooned to a level unmatched by any television network or streaming service. According to Variety Insight, Netflix produced a total of 240 new original shows and movies in 2018, then climbed to 371 in 2019, a figure "greater than the number of original series that the entire U.S. TV industry released in 2005." The Netflix budget allocated to production increased annually, reaching $13.6 billion in 2021 and projected to hit $18.9 billion by 2025, a figure that once again overshadowed any of its competitors. As of August 2022, original productions made up 50% of Netflix's overall library in the US.

=== Film and television deals ===
Netflix has exclusive pay TV deals with several studios. The deals give Netflix exclusive streaming rights while adhering to the structures of traditional pay TV terms.

Distributors that have licensed content to Netflix include Warner Bros., Universal Pictures, Sony Pictures Entertainment and previously The Walt Disney Studios. Netflix also holds current and back-catalog rights to television programs distributed by Walt Disney Television, DreamWorks Classics, Kino International, PBS, AMC Global Media, Warner Bros. Television and Paramount Global Content Distribution, along with titles from other companies such as ABS-CBN Studios, GMA Network Inc., Cignal Entertainment, MQ Studios, Regal Entertainment, Viva Communications, Solar Entertainment Corporation, MNC Media, Screenplay Films, Soraya Intercine Films, CJ ENM, JTBC, Kakao Entertainment, TBS, TV Asahi, Fuji TV, Mediacorp, Primeworks Studios, Astro Shaw, GMM Grammy, Public Television Service, Sanlih E-Television, Gala Television, Tencent Pictures, Alibaba Pictures, One Cool Pictures, Mattel Studios, Annapurna Pictures, ITV Studios, Banijay Entertainment, Hasbro Entertainment, FilmRise, Gaumont and StudioCanal. Formerly, the streaming service also held rights to select television programs distributed by NBCUniversal Television Distribution, Sony Pictures Television and 20th Century Fox Television.

Netflix negotiated to distribute animated films from Universal that HBO declined to acquire, such as The Lorax, ParaNorman, and Minions.

Netflix holds exclusive streaming rights to the film library of Studio Ghibli (except Grave of the Fireflies) worldwide except in the US and Japan as part of an agreement signed with Ghibli's international sales holder Wild Bunch in 2020.

=== Live programming ===
==== Sports ====
Netflix began with more focus on sports-related documentaries, like the popular Drive To Survive series, before moving toward live-action sports with one-off events. First was The Netflix Cup on November 14, 2023, featuring drivers and golfers from the docu-series Formula 1: Drive to Survive and Full Swing. Next came The Netflix Slam in March 2024, which showed an exhibition match between tennis stars Rafael Nadal and Carlos Alcaraz.

In November 2024, Netflix streamed a boxing fight between former world heavyweight champion Mike Tyson and YouTuber Jake Paul. More than 60 million households watched the match. This marked the start of the company's broadcast of live boxing fights.

In December 2024, Netflix would become FIFA's exclusive US broadcaster of the 2027 and 2031 FIFA Women's World Cup. On December 25, Netflix aired its first-ever NFL games: the Kansas City Chiefs versus the Pittsburgh Steelers, and the Baltimore Ravens versus the Houston Texans.

Netflix paid $5 billion to stream Raw, WWE's flagship weekly wrestling show, for 10 years, starting in January 2025. In the fall of 2025, Netflix moved into the field of baseball. In August, Netflix announced an exclusivity deal to stream the World Baseball Classic in Japan starting in 2026. In November, it acquired rights to selected Major League Baseball (MLB) games for the 2026 to 2028 seasons. In December 2025, Netflix broadcast its fourth major boxing event with the fight between Jake Paul and former world heavyweight champion Anthony Joshua, on December 19.

In March 2026, Elle Duncan left ESPN to become Netflix's first sports anchor. Also that month, former baseball player Barry Bonds was announced to be joining Netflix for MLB coverage. In May 2026, Netflix announced that it would expand to five NFL games in the 2026-2027 season. This package includes the first-ever Australia game, the first-ever Thanksgiving Eve game, two Christmas Day games and a Week 18 game. In May 2026, Netflix announced they would air the Westminster Kennel Club Dog Show starting in 2027.

In July 2026, Netflix aired the MLB Home Run Derby for the first time as part of its three-year media rights agreement with Major League Baseball. Netflix acquired exclusive broadcast rights, in October 2026, to the 2030 FIFA World Cup, scheduled to take place in Spain and Andorra.

=== Netflix Games ===
Netflix games logo

In July 2021, Netflix hired Mike Verdu, a former executive from Electronic Arts and Facebook, as vice president of game development, along with plans to add video games by 2022. Netflix announced plans to release mobile games that would be included in subscribers' service plans. Trial offerings were first launched for Netflix users in Poland in August 2021, offering premium mobile games based on Stranger Things including Stranger Things 3: The Game, for free to subscribers through the Netflix mobile app.

Netflix officially launched mobile games on November 2, 2021, for Android users around the world. Through the app, subscribers had free access to five games, including two previously made Stranger Things titles. Netflix intends to add more games to this service over time. On November 9, the collection launched for iOS. Verdu said in October 2022 that besides continuing to expand its portfolio of games, it was also interested in cloud gaming options.

To support the games effort, Netflix began acquiring and forming a number of studios. The company acquired Night School Studio, an independent video game developer, in September 2021. Netflix announced plans to acquire Next Games in March 2022 for €65 million as part of Netflix's expansions into gaming. Next Games had developed the mobile title Stranger Things: Puzzle Tales as well as two The Walking Dead mobile games. Later in the month, Netflix also acquired the Texas-based mobile game developer, Boss Fight Entertainment, for an undisclosed sum. Netflix opened a mobile game studio in Helsinki, Finland in September 2022, and a new studio, its fifth overall, in southern California in October 2022, alongside the acquisition of Spry Fox in Seattle.

In June 2024, Verdu was moved into a new role focusing on "innovation in game development." The next month, Netflix hired Alain Tascan, vice president of game development at Epic Games, to head up Netflix Games. As of July 2024, Netflix has over 80 games in development, releasing at least one game each month to attract fans. The company shut down its Southern California "Team Blue" AAA gaming studio in October 2024, leading to the departure of developers like Overwatch producer Chacko Sonny, Halo veteran Joseph Staten and God of War art director Rafael Grassetti. Netflix indicated that it maintains a commitment to grow its gaming business despite the changes. In late October, Netflix announced several games based on hit series including Netflix Stories: Outer Banks, Netflix Stories: A Perfect Couple, Netflix Stories: A Virgin River Christmas, and The Ultimatum: Choices, as well as a new daily word game in partnership with TED Talks, TED Tumblewords.

On December 12, 2024, at The Game Awards 2024, Netflix Games revealed game designer Yu Suzuki's next game Steel Paws. In November 2025, Netflix released its first batch of TV games which members play by using their phone as a controller. The games included Boggle Party, Lego Party, Pictionary: Game Night, Tetris Time Warp and Party Crasher: Fool Your Friends.

In April 2026, Netflix launched "Netflix Playground", a gaming app for children featuring ad-free, offline-playable games based on popular characters, as part of its strategy to expand in family-oriented gaming.

== Technology ==
=== API ===
On October 1, 2008, Netflix offered access to its service via a public application programming interface (API). It allowed access to data for all Netflix titles, and allows users to manage their movie queues. The API was free and allowed commercial use. In June 2012, Netflix began to restrict the availability of its public API. Netflix instead focused on a small number of known partners using private interfaces, since most traffic came from those private interfaces. In November 2014, Netflix retired the public API. Netflix then partnered with the developers of eight services deemed the most valuable, including Instant Watcher, Fanhattan, Yidio and Nextguide.

=== Recommendations and thumbnails ===
Netflix presents viewers with recommendations based on interactions with the service, such as previous viewing history and ratings of viewed content. These are often grouped into genres and formats, or feature the platform's highest-rated content. Each title is presented with a thumbnail. Before around 2015, these were the same key art for everyone, but since then has been customized. Netflix may select a specific key art for a thumbnail based on viewing history, such as an actor or scene type based on genre preferences. Some thumbnails are generated from video stills.

The Netflix recommendation system is a vital part of the streaming platform's success, enabling personalized content suggestions for hundreds of millions of subscribers worldwide. Using advanced machine learning algorithms, Netflix analyzes user interactions, including viewing history, searches, and ratings, to deliver personalized recommendations for movies and TV shows.

The recommendation system considers individual user preferences, similarities with other users with comparable tastes, specific title attributes (genre, release year, etc.), device usage patterns, and viewing time. As users interact with the platform and provide feedback with their viewing habits, the recommendation system is able to adapt and refine its suggestions over time. Netflix uses a two-tiered ranking system, using the presentation of titles on the homepage for easy navigation to maximize user engagement. This is done by organizing content into rows and ranking the titles within each row based on how much the user would be interested in it. Netflix also uses A/B testing to determine what causes the biggest interest and engagement related to options concerning movie suggestions and how titles are organized.

Tags like "bittersweet", "sitcom", or "intimate" are assigned to each title by Netflix employees. Netflix also uses the tags to create recommendation micro-genres like "Goofy TV Shows" or "Girls Night In".

Netflix launched "responsive recommendations", which display titles on the home page based on what its users are actively searching, in 2025.

=== Artificial intelligence ===
In April 2026, a team from Netflix and INSAIT published an inpainting model called VOID ("Video Object and Interaction Deletion"), a tool that removes objects from videos and changes further frames based on its understanding of physical causality. The model was based on another model from Alibaba PAI.

== Availability and access ==
=== Global availability ===
Countries where Netflix is available (as of September 2026): Available Unavailable (China, North Korea, Russia, and Syria.)

Netflix is available in every country and territory except for China, Crimea, North Korea, Syria, and Russia.

In January 2016, Netflix announced it would begin VPN blocking since it can be used to watch videos from a country where they are unavailable. The result of the VPN block is that people can only watch videos available worldwide and other videos are hidden from search results.

In July 2026, Netflix announced a video-licensing agreement with several digital publishers, including Variety, under which selected videos from the publication would be available on the platform. The videos began appearing on Netflix in August 2026 in the United States, Canada, the United Kingdom, Ireland, Australia and New Zealand. Hebrew and Arabic right-to-left interface orientation is part of Netflix's localization for Middle Eastern markets. In some regions, Netflix also offers a more affordable mobile-only subscription.

=== Subscriptions ===
Customers can subscribe to one of three plans; the difference in plans relates to video resolution, the number of simultaneous streams, and the number of devices to which content can be downloaded.

At the end of Q1 2022, Netflix estimated that 100 million households globally were sharing passwords to their account with others. In March 2022, Netflix began to charge a fee for additional users in Chile, Peru, and Costa Rica to attempt to control account sharing. On July 18, 2022, Netflix announced that it would test the account sharing feature in more countries, including Argentina, Dominican Republic, El Salvador, Guatemala and Honduras. On October 17, Netflix launched Profile Transfer to help end account sharing.

On July 13, 2022, Netflix announced plans to launch an advertising-supported subscription option. Netflix's planned advertising tier would not allow subscribers to download content like the existing ad-free platform. On July 20, 2022, it was announced that the advertising-supported tier would be coming to Netflix in 2023 but it would not feature the full library of content. In October, the launch date was announced as November 3, 2022, and was launched in 12 countries: US, Canada, Mexico, Brazil, UK, France, Germany, Italy, Spain, Australia, Japan and South Korea. The ad-supported plan was called "Basic with Ads" and it cost $6.99 per month in the US at launch.

On February 24, 2023, Netflix cut subscription prices in more than 30 countries around the world to attract more subscribers from those countries. Malaysia, Indonesia, Thailand, the Philippines, Croatia, Venezuela, Kenya, and Iran are on the list of countries where the cost for a subscription will be reduced. In the same month stronger anti-password-sharing rules were expanded to Canada, New Zealand, Portugal, and Spain. In May 2023, these measures were further expanded to US and Brazil subscribers.

In July 2023, Netflix added 5.9 million subscribers for the second quarter of the year for a total of 238.39 million subscribers overall. The US and Canada accounted for 1.2 million subscribers which was the largest regional quarterly gain since 2021.

In February, Netflix announced it would enforce stricter regulations on password sharing, and by May 2023 it began cracking down in the US, UK, and Australia. Under these new rules, multiple people can use and share one account, but they have to be under the same household. Netflix defines a household as people who live in the same location as the owner of the account. Users are asked to set a primary location based on the device's IP address.

Netflix reported 8.05 million new subscribers in Q2 2024, up from 5.9 million subscribers added in Q2 2023.

In July 2024, Netflix started phasing out its cheapest subscription plan for users in France and the US, a year after the plan was removed for Canada and the UK. Members in these countries have the option to sign up for either the standard ad-free plan or the ad plan. In April 2026, Netflix raised its U.S. subscription prices across all plans. In May 2026, Netflix announced that the ad tier will expand to 15 new countries in 2027, including Austria, Belgium, Colombia, Denmark, Indonesia, Ireland, the Netherlands, New Zealand, Norway, Peru, the Philippines, Poland, Sweden, Switzerland and Thailand.

=== Device support ===
Netflix can be accessed via a web browser, while Netflix apps are available on various platforms, including Blu-ray players, tablet computers, mobile phones, smart TVs, digital media players, and video game consoles. Currently supported game consoles include:

- Microsoft Xbox 360, Xbox One and Xbox Series X/S
- PlayStation 4 and PlayStation 5

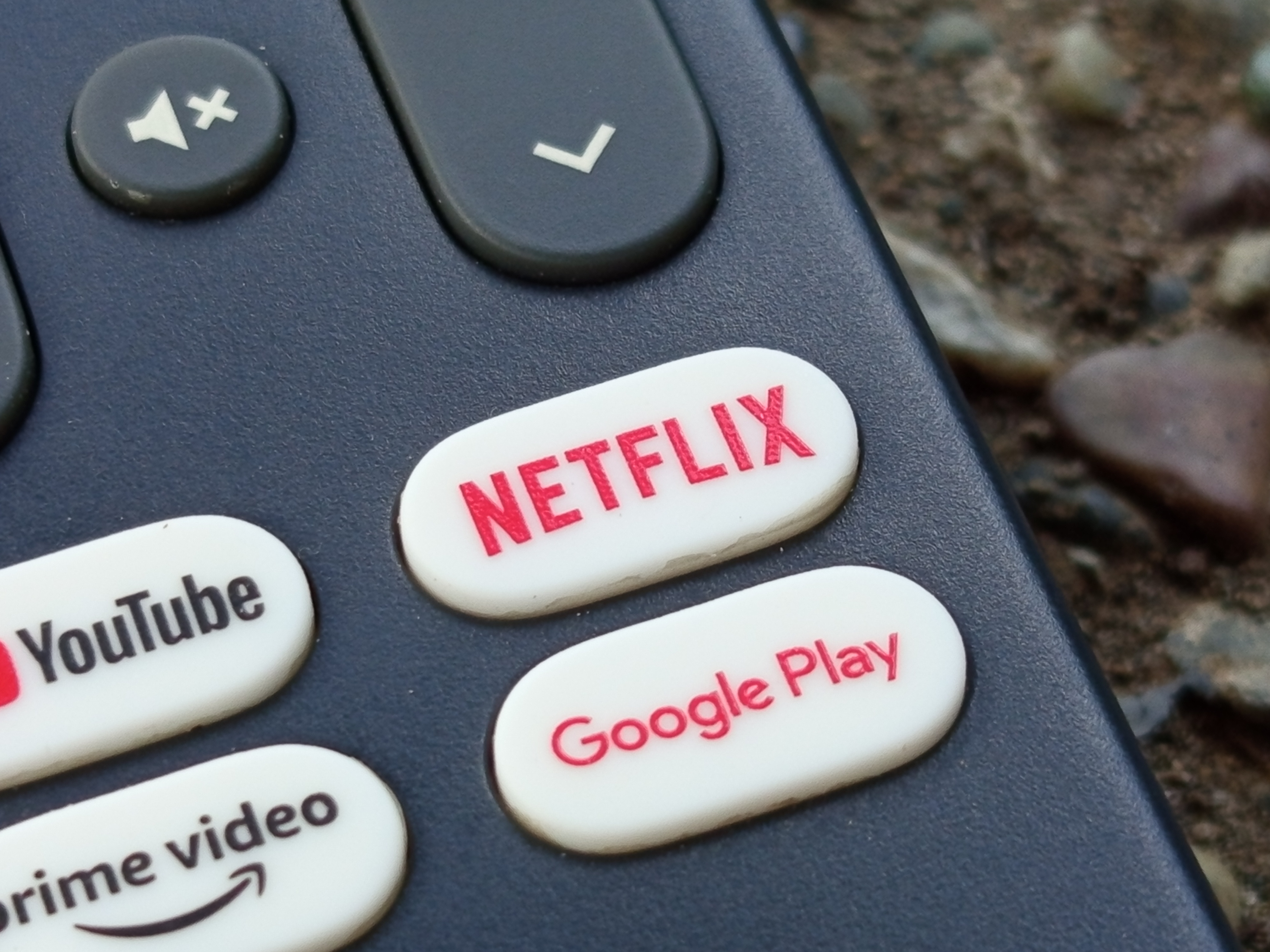
An Android TV-powered remote control with a Netflix button

Several older devices no longer support Netflix. For home gaming consoles, this includes the PlayStation 2, PlayStation 3, PlayStation TV, Wii and Wii U. For handheld gaming consoles, this includes the Nintendo 3DS family of systems and the PlayStation Vita. The second and third generation Apple TV previously supported Netflix with an ad-free plan, but the app was automatically removed on these devices on July 31, 2024.

In addition, a growing number of multichannel television providers, including cable television and IPTV services, have added Netflix apps accessible within their own set-top boxes, sometimes with the ability for its content (along with those of other online video services) to be presented within a unified search interface alongside linear television programming as an "all-in-one" solution.

The maximum video resolution supported on computers is dependent on the DRM systems available on a particular operating system and web browser.

Operating System	Web Browser	DRM system	Maximum allowed video resolution	Allowed audio and video formats
Microsoft Windows 7 or later MacOS 10.11 or later Linux (dependent on distribution variant)	Google Chrome, Firefox, Opera	Widevine	1080p (with Widevine L1)	H.264, HEVC, AV1, AAC, TTML
Microsoft Windows 10 or later	Microsoft Edge, Desktop app	PlayReady	4K (device must fulfill hardware requirements)	H.264, HEVC, AV1, AAC, TTML, Dolby Digital Plus and Dolby Atmos (Requires Dolby-capable device)
MacOS 10.11 through MacOS 10.15	Apple Safari	FairPlay	1080p	H.264, HEVC, AAC, TTML
MacOS 11 or later	Apple Safari	FairPlay	4K	H.264, HEVC, AV1, AAC, TTML
ChromeOS	Google Chrome	Widevine	1080p (with Widevine L1)	H.264, HEVC, AV1, AAC, TTML
Android	Mobile app	Widevine	480p (devices with Widevine L3 only); 1080p (devices with Widevine L1 certification)	H.264, HEVC, AV1, AAC, TTML
Android TV	TV app	Widevine	4K (device must fulfill hardware requirements)	H.264, HEVC, AV1, AAC, TTML, Dolby Digital Plus and Dolby Atmos
Xbox One or later	Game console app	PlayReady	4K (requires Xbox Series X and Series S; audio/video device must fulfill hardware requirements)	H.264, HEVC, AV1, AAC, TTML, Dolby Digital Plus and Dolby Atmos (Requires Dolby-capable audio/video device)
PlayStation 4 or later	Game console app	PlayReady	4K (requires PlayStation 5; audio/video device must fulfill hardware requirements)	H.264, HEVC, AV1, AAC, TTML, Dolby Digital Plus and Dolby Atmos (Requires Dolby-capable audio/video device)
iOS	Mobile app	FairPlay	1080p	H.264, HEVC, AV1, AAC, TTML
iPadOS	Tablet app	FairPlay	4K	H.264, HEVC, AV1, AAC, TTML
Apple TV	TV app	FairPlay	4K (requires Apple TV 4K; audio/video device must fulfill hardware requirements)	H.264, HEVC, AV1, AAC, TTML, Dolby Digital Plus and Dolby Atmos (Requires Dolby-capable audio/video device)

== Awards ==
On July 18, 2013, Netflix earned the first Primetime Emmy Awards nominations for original streaming programs at the 65th Primetime Emmy Awards. Three of its series, Arrested Development, Hemlock Grove and House of Cards, earned a combined 14 nominations (nine for House of Cards, three for Arrested Development and two for Hemlock Grove). The House of Cards episode "Chapter 1" received four nominations for both the 65th Primetime Emmy Awards and 65th Primetime Creative Arts Emmy Awards, becoming the first episode of a streaming television series to receive a major Primetime Emmy Award nomination. With its win for Outstanding Cinematography for a Single-Camera Series, "Chapter 1" became the first episode from a streaming service to be awarded an Emmy. David Fincher's win for Directing for a Drama Series for House of Cards made the episode the first from a streaming service to win a Primetime Emmy.

On November 6, 2013, Netflix earned its first Grammy nomination when "You've Got Time" by Regina Spektor—the main title theme song for Orange Is the New Black—was nominated for Best Song Written for Visual Media.

On December 12, 2013, the network earned six nominations for Golden Globe Awards, including four for House of Cards. Among those nominations was Wright for Golden Globe Award for Best Actress – Television Series Drama for her portrayal of Claire Underwood, which she won. With the accolade, Wright became the first actress to win a Golden Globe for a streaming television series. It also marked Netflix's first major acting award. House of Cards and Orange is the New Black also won Peabody Awards in 2013.

On January 16, 2014, Netflix became the first streaming service to earn an Academy Award nomination when The Square was nominated for Best Documentary Feature.

On July 10, 2014, Netflix received 31 Emmy nominations. Among other nominations, House of Cards received nominations for Outstanding Drama Series, Outstanding Directing in a Drama Series and Outstanding Writing in a Drama Series. Kevin Spacey and Robin Wright were nominated for Outstanding Lead Actor and Outstanding Lead Actress in a Drama Series. Orange is the New Black was nominated in the comedy categories, earning nominations for Outstanding Comedy Series, Outstanding Writing for a Comedy Series and Outstanding Directing for a Comedy Series. Taylor Schilling, Kate Mulgrew, and Uzo Aduba were respectively nominated for Outstanding Lead Actress in a Comedy Series, Outstanding Supporting Actress in a Comedy Series and Outstanding Guest Actress in a Comedy Series (the latter was for Aduba's recurring role in season one, as she was promoted to series regular for the show's second season).

Netflix won the largest share of 2016 Emmy Award nominations, with 16 major nominations. However, streaming shows only got 24 nominations out of a total of 139, falling significantly behind cable. The 16 Netflix nominees were: House of Cards with Kevin Spacey, A Very Murray Christmas with Bill Murray, Unbreakable Kimmy Schmidt, Master of None, and Bloodline.

Stranger Things received 19 nominations at the 2017 Primetime Emmy Awards, while The Crown received 13 nominations.

In December 2017, Netflix was awarded PETA's Company of the Year for promoting animal rights movies and documentaries like Forks Over Knives and What the Health.

At the 90th Academy Awards, held on March 4, 2018, the film Icarus, distributed by Netflix, won its first Academy Award for Best Documentary Feature Film. During his remarks backstage, director and writer Bryan Fogel remarked that Netflix had "single-handedly changed the documentary world." Icarus had its premiere at the 2017 Sundance Film Festival and was bought by Netflix for $5 million, one of the biggest deals ever for a non-fiction film. Netflix became the network whose programs received more nomination at the 2018 Primetime and Creative Arts Emmy Awards with 112 nominations, therefore breaking HBO's 17-years record as a network whose programs received more nomination at the Emmys, which received 108 nominations.

On January 22, 2019, films distributed by Netflix scored 15 nominations for the 91st Academy Awards, including Academy Award for Best Picture for Alfonso Cuarón's Roma, which was nominated for 10 awards. The 15 nominations equal the total nominations films distributed by Netflix had received in previous years.

In 2020, Netflix received 20 TV nominations and films distributed by Netflix also got 22 film nominations at the 78th Golden Globe Awards. It secured three out of the five nominations for best drama TV series for The Crown, Ozark and Ratched and four of the five nominations for best actress in a TV series: Olivia Colman, Emma Corrin, Laura Linney and Sarah Paulson.

In 2020, Netflix earned 24 Academy Award nominations, marking the first time a streaming service led all studios.

Films and programs distributed by Netflix received 30 nominations at the 2021 Screen Actors Guild Awards, more than any other distribution company, where its distributed films and programs won seven awards including best motion picture for The Trial of the Chicago 7 and best TV drama for The Crown. Netflix also received the most nominations of any studio at the 93rd Academy Awards—35 total nominations with 7 award wins.

In February 2022, The Power of the Dog, a gritty western distributed by Netflix and directed by Jane Campion, received 12 nominations, including Best Picture, for the 94th annual Academy Awards. Films distributed by the streamer received a total of 72 nominations. Campion became the third female to receive the Best Director award, winning her second Oscar for The Power of the Dog. At the 50th International Emmy Awards, Netflix original Sex Education won Best Comedy Series. Later that year, Netflix received 26 Emmy Awards including six for Squid Game. The Squid Game wins for Outstanding Lead Actor in a Drama Series and Outstanding Directing for a Drama Series were the first-ever for a non-English language series in those categories.

In March 2023, Netflix won six Academy Awards including four for All Quiet on the Western Front which was the most awarded Netflix film in its history. Guillermo del Toro's Pinocchio was the first streaming film to win Best Animated Feature and The Elephant Whisperers was the first Indian-produced film to receive Best Documentary Short Film. Netflix received 103 Emmy nominations including 13 each for the limited series Beef and Dahmer – Monster: The Jeffrey Dahmer Story.

In July 2024, Netflix received 107 Emmy nominations, which was the most of any network.

In January 2025, Netflix received 18 Academy Award nominations across six titles—the most of any studio. Thirteen of those nominations belonged to the musical crime drama Emilia Pérez, making it the most nominated film of the year and the most nominated non-English language film in Academy history. Emilia Pérez ultimately won an award for Best Original Song for "El Mal" and Zoe Saldaña was awarded Best Supporting Actress. Other Netflix films recognized with nominations were The Only Girl in the Orchestra, which took home the award for Best Documentary Short, Pablo Larraín's Maria, Tyler Perry's The Six Triple Eight, animated feature Wallace & Gromit: Vengeance Most Fowl, and live-action short film Anuja.

In July 2025, Netflix received 120 Emmy nominations, including 13 nods for Adolescence, 11 for Monsters: The Lyle and Erik Menendez Story and 10 for Black Mirror. It won 30, including eight for Outstanding Limited or Anthology Series winner Adolescence. The show's star, Owen Cooper, was the youngest Emmy winner ever in any male acting category at 15 years old.

In January 2026, Netflix received 17 Academy Award nominations across six titles. These included Guillermo del Toro's Frankenstein with nine nominations (Best Picture, Best Supporting Actor, Best Original Score, Best Cinematography, Best Makeup and Hairstyling, Best Costume Design, Best Adapted Screenplay, Best Production Design, Best Sound), Clint Bentley's Train Dreams with four nominations (Best Picture, Best Adapted Screenplay, Best Cinematography, Best Original Song), The Perfect Neighbor for Best Documentary, KPop Demon Hunters for Best Animated Feature, as well as two short films: The Singers and All the Empty Rooms, nominated for Live Action Short Film and Documentary Short Film, respectively.

In July 2026, Netflix received 111 Primetime Emmy Award nominations.

== Criticism ==
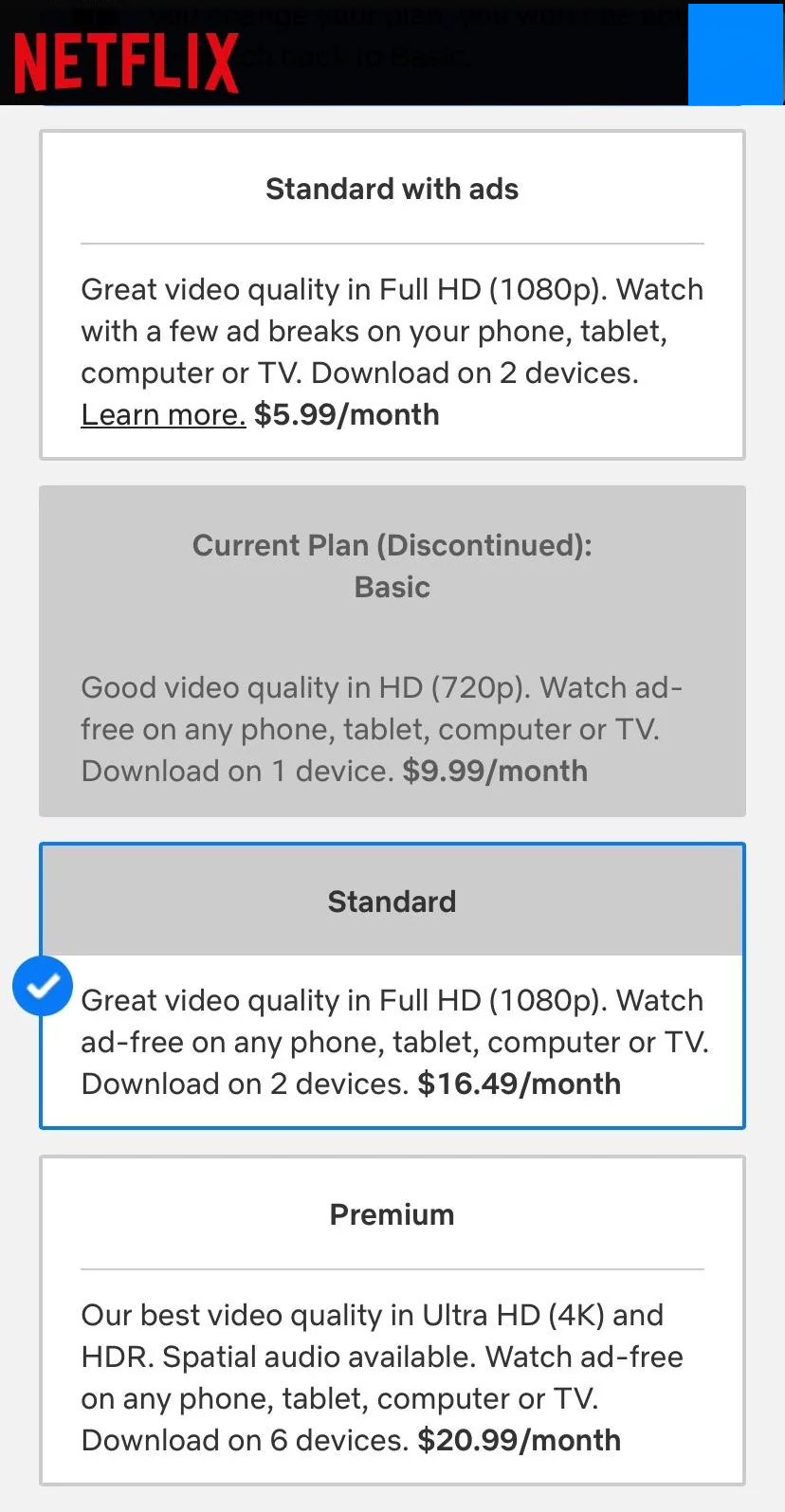
In 2024, Netflix discontinued its cheapest ad-free Basic plan. Users who were on the plan would have to pay extra for the next cheapest ad-free plan.

Customers of Netflix have complained about price increases in Netflix offerings dating back to the company's decision to separate its DVD rental and streaming services, which was quickly reversed. As Netflix increased its streaming output, it has faced calls to limit accessibility to graphic violence and include viewer advisories for issues such as sensationalism and promotion of pseudoscience. Netflix's content has also been criticized by disability rights movement advocates for lack of closed captioning quality. The launch of ad-supported plans has also been criticized by some subscribers as undermining Netflix's once ad-free experience.

Netflix has also faced criticism for complying with government censorship requests. In 2019, it removed an episode of Patriot Act with Hasan Minhaj from its service in Saudi Arabia after authorities claimed it violated local cybercrime laws, prompting criticism from free speech advocates and human rights organizations. In 2020, Netflix disclosed that it had complied with government requests to restrict access to content in countries including Saudi Arabia, Singapore, Vietnam, and Germany.

Some media organizations and competitors have criticized Netflix for selectively releasing ratings and viewer numbers of its original programming. The company has made claims boasting about viewership records without providing data to substantiate its successes or using problematic estimation methods. In March 2020, some government agencies called for Netflix and other streamers to limit services due to increased broadband and energy consumption as use of the platform increased. In response, the company announced it would reduce bit rate across all streams in Europe, thus decreasing Netflix traffic on European networks by around 25%. These same steps were later taken in India.

Netflix played a major role in changing how audiences watch television by encouraging binge-watching, in which viewers watch multiple episodes of a series in one sitting. The company's practice of releasing entire seasons of original shows at once differed from the traditional weekly television schedule. Netflix also contributed to the decline of cable television by making streaming more popular and increasing demand for original online content.

In May 2022, Netflix's shareholder Imperium Irrevocable Trust filed a lawsuit against the company for violating the US securities laws. In January 2024, a federal judge dismissed the suit, stating that shareholders failed to provide instances of Netflix lying about subscriber growth.

In May 2023, Netflix officially banned the use of password sharing between individuals of different households, meaning sharing an account was only available to those living in the same house. After reporting a record number of new subscribers in Q4 2024, Netflix raised prices in early 2025, and again in March 2026.

== See also ==
- List of streaming media services
