= WP Rocket =

Wordpress Plugin

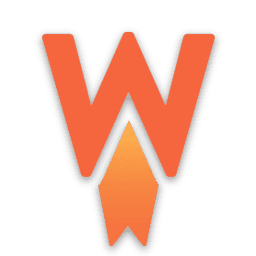
- Official logo of WP Rocket
- Developer: WP Media
- Release: July 2013; 13 years ago
- Written in: PHP, JavaScript
- Operating system: Cross-platform
- Platform: WordPress
- Type: Web performance, Caching
- License: GNU General Public License
- Website: wp-rocket.me

WP Rocket is an open-source web performance premium plugin for WordPress. The plugin uses caching to accelerate website loading times.

Launched in July 2013, WP Rocket announced in July 2026 that it had reach 5.5 million websites installations worldwide.

== History ==
WP Rocket is the first product of WP Media, a company created in 2014 that provides software to optimize web performance. WP Media is headquartered in Lyon, France and was founded by Julio Potier, Jonathan Buttigieg and Jean-Baptiste Marchand-Arvier, and has an employee base working remotely in multiple locations throughout the world.

In 2016, WP Media launched Imagify, WordPress plugin that makes images lighter.

In 2020, WP Media launched RocketCDN, a content delivery network service.

In May 2021, WP Media was acquired by group.ONE. The Cash Out podcast released an episode on May 30, 2023 featuring Jonathan Buttigieg, in which it was reported that the sale of WP Media was valued at between 25 and 75 million euros. Buttigieg neither confirmed nor denied the mentioned amount during the episode.

== Usage ==
The plugin works natively on Apache and nginx web servers. A customizable configuration for nginx called Rocket-Nginx (created and maintained by SatelliteWP), dedicated to the WP Rocket and nginx, allows serving cached files without having to initialize WordPress or make database calls. This enhances the speed and the number of visitors a website can support. The latest version of Rocket-Nginx (version 3.x) enables query string management, file inclusion and custom expiration.

As of March 2024, WP Rocket was the third-most-popular WordPress plugin and on 3.38% of the top million sites using WordPress Plugins.

== Licensing ==
WP Rocket is free software released under GNU General Public License version 2. WP Rocket source code is publicly available from its GitHub repository.
