= Netflix button =

Button on remotes

The Netflix button is a button available on many modern remote controllers, used to directly connect to the popular streaming service Netflix. It was initially implemented in America in 2011. In 2015, the button was added to European remotes. This button sends a Netflix hotkey command to the television or streaming player and opens up the Netflix app.

== Adoption ==
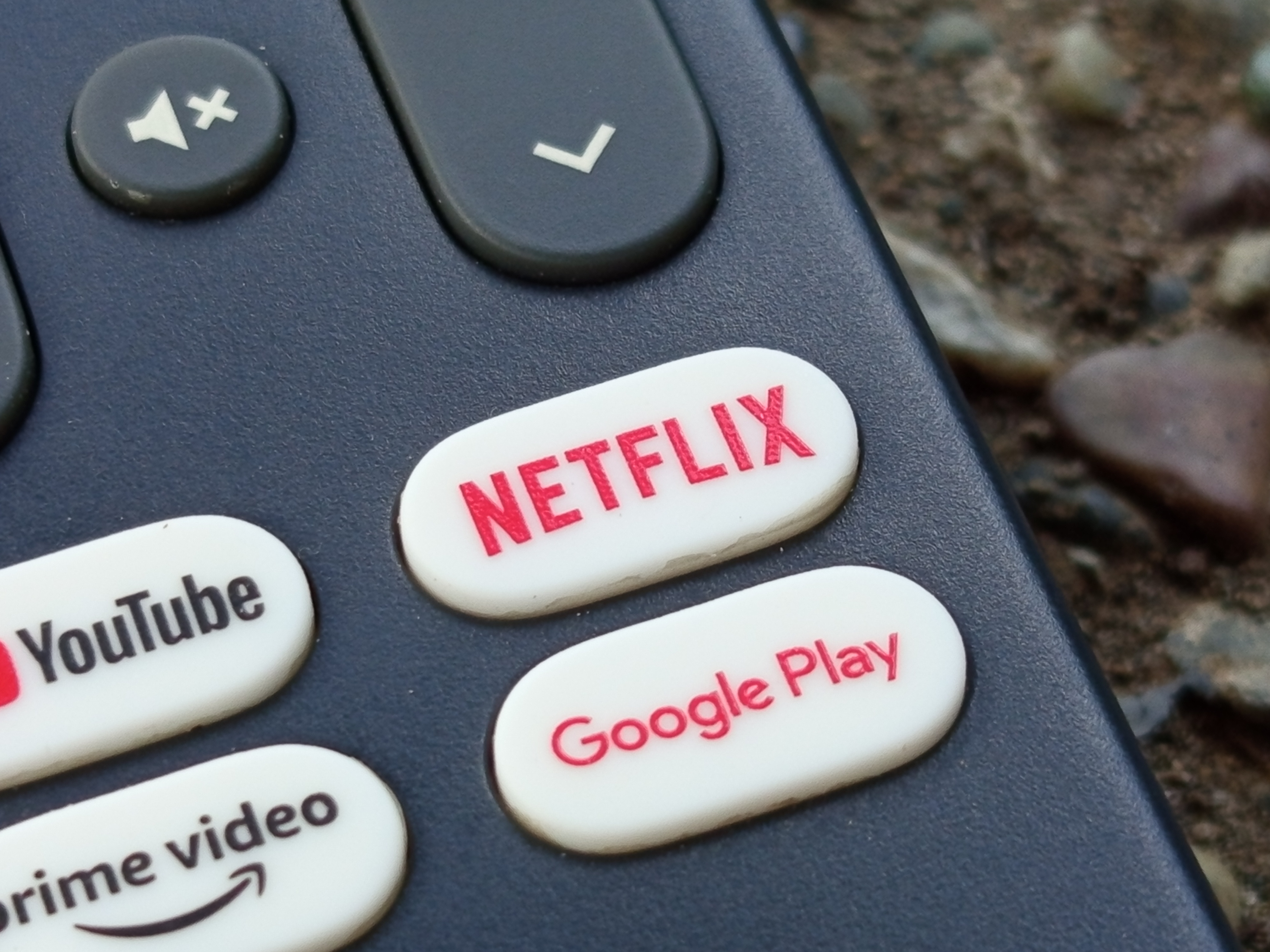
Netflix button on Google's Android TV reference RCU remote

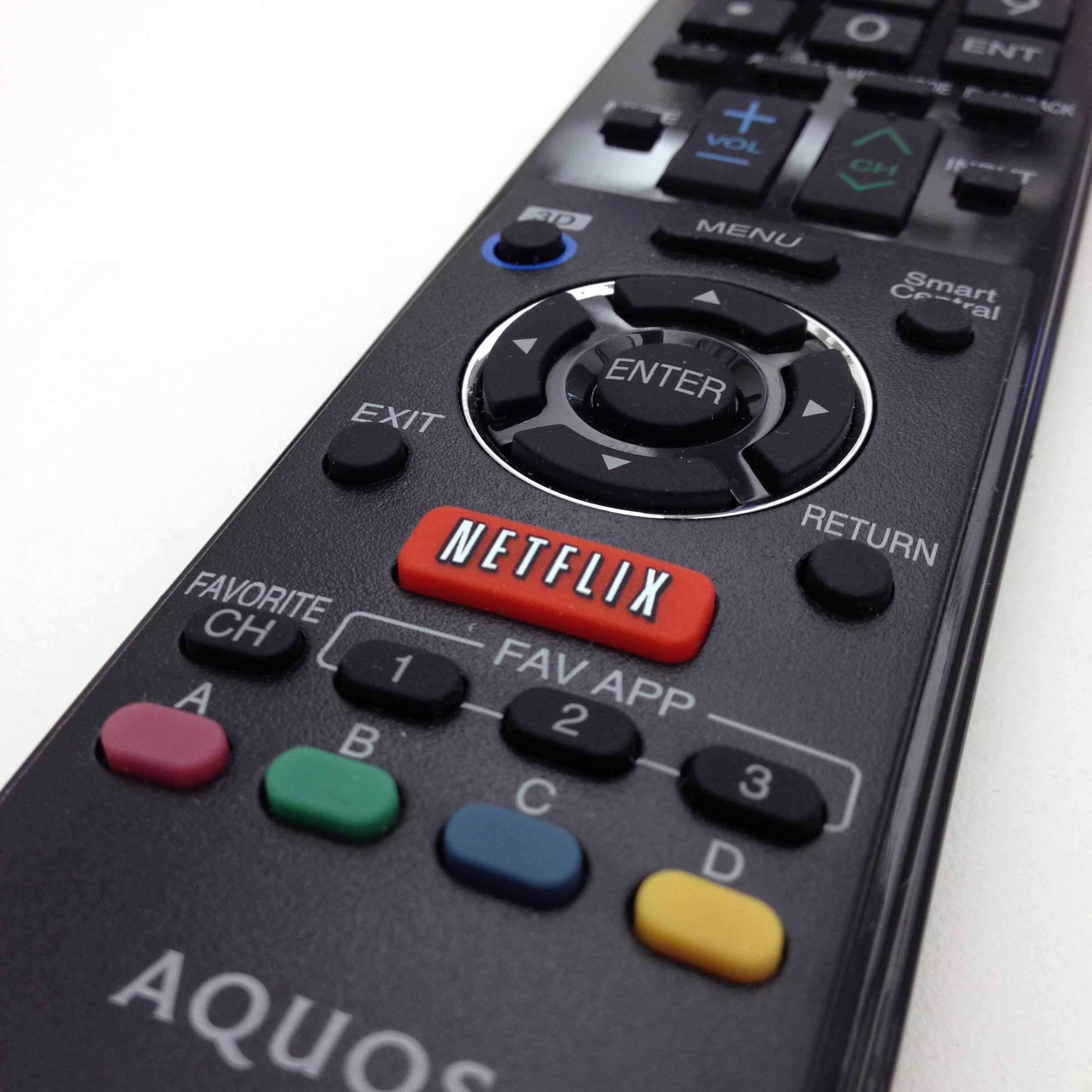
The older Netflix button on a Sharp Aquos TV remote

Many popular TV companies have adopted the Netflix button, including: LG, Samsung, Sony, and Hisense. Some of the TVs have made it to a list that Netflix has dubbed the "Netflix Recommended TVs". These are TVs that have a Netflix button on them which Netflix recommends to their subscribers to get the best viewing experience for their service. Some low-end laptop computers in emerging markets also ship with streaming buttons (or rather keys), typically including Netflix. Brazilian OEM Positivo has been including Netflix keys on their laptops since 2018.

== Mechanism ==
The Netflix button only works on those TVs that support it, this includes: "Smart TVs, game consoles, streaming media players, set-top boxes, and Blu-ray players". Although hard-programmed on many devices, the Netflix button as of recent has been opening up to re-purposing. On the NVIDIA Shield, the remote has a Netflix button that can be intercepted and remapped using a third-party app. But the resultant user experience is not as smooth as the native functionality.

Netflix, in 2015, had also open-sourced a design for consumers to create their own Netflix button with additional features. Labeled "The Switch", this homemade device can dim the lights, silence incoming phone calls, order take-out, and open Netflix with one button press. The Switch is part of a series of DIY projects Netflix created, knows as "Netflix Make It" for their consumers to learn more about programming and create their own projects.

== Criticism ==
The introduction of the Netflix button was criticized; an article from "The Verge" says that the button comes as a constant advertisement on a device you had already paid up to thousands of dollars for. Arguing that the buttons are "putting making money ahead of actual user experience or design". Initially, concerns had been raised about whether the button violates the principle of net neutrality, by putting its streaming competitors in disadvantage. A common complaint is that someone who is not a Netflix subscriber who accidentally presses the Netflix button is taken to a useless screen.

A popular option for streaming services, Roku, has 4 separate streaming buttons on their remotes. Each of these buttons cost the streaming service one dollar per unit sold. The Roku has many different buttons for the consumer to choose, but most of the remotes feature a Netflix button on them.

By the early 2020s other streaming services and media, such as Hulu, Amazon Prime Video, Samsung TV Plus, Spotify, Crunchyroll, YouTube, and Disney+, also had got their own buttons.
