= Stranger Things 3: The Game =

- Developer: BonusXP
- Publisher: Netflix Games (Note: Self-published by BonusXP in Europe and Australia for PlayStation 4 and Xbox One, and for Windows exclusively on the Epic Games Store)
- Platforms: macOS; Nintendo Switch; PlayStation 4; Windows; Xbox One; Android; iOS
- Release: macOS, Switch, PS4, Windows, Xbox One; July 4, 2019; Android, iOS; August 29, 2019
- Genre: Beat 'em up
- Modes: Single-player, multiplayer

Stranger Things 3: The Game is a beat 'em up video game developed by BonusXP. It is based on the third season of Stranger Things. It was initially released on a multitude of platforms, but it is now only available for Netflix subscribers on Android and iOS. It is a retro-style pixel art game that mimics the 16-bit era.

== Gameplay ==
Players replay scenes from the third season of Stranger Things. There are twelve playable characters from the series, each of whom has a unique weapon and abilities. The weapons can be upgraded using a crafting system. Players can explore the open world, but some areas are only accessible if players have recruited a specific character. Up to two characters can be active at a time; the second is controlled either by the computer or another player via local multiplayer. Players can switch between characters at any time. Combat is frequent and similar to Streets of Rage. It is played from an isometric viewpoint.

== Development ==
Developer BonusXP was based in Texas until closing in 2023. It released Stranger Things 3: The Game for macOS, Switch, PlayStation 4, Windows, and Xbox One on July 4, 2019. It was ported to Android and iOS on August 29, 2019. In August 2021, the game was delisted from Steam, GOG.com, and Epic Games Store and released exclusively for Netflix subscribers, who can install it for free on Android and iOS.

== Reception ==
Reception

Aggregate score
Aggregator	Score
Metacritic	(PC) 62/100 (PS4) 57/100 (XONE) 72/100 (NS) 53/100

Review scores
Publication	Score
Game Informer	6/10
IGN	6.9/10
Nintendo Life	7/10
Push Square	4/10

Stranger Things 3: The Game received mixed reviews on Metacritic. Eurogamer said the maps were large and empty, and they felt the retro pixel art graphics did not work for Stranger Things. They enjoyed some of the puzzles, but they called the game overall "a shallow recreation". IGN said it is "thoughtfully conceived" but has "thin combat and repetitive quests". They said it will likely appeal only to "the most die-hard fans of the show". Push Square said it "leaves a lot to be desired" and criticized the decision to repeat the events of the third season verbatim. They recommended people watch the show instead, calling the gameplay and presentation "terribly flat". Although they initially enjoyed sightseeing in a retro video game adaptation, which they said "emulates the '80s aesthetic well", Game Informer felt the combat and quests become boring and repetitive.

Nintendo Life similarly criticized the quests and combat, which they said could be a slog for players who are not fans of the series, but they said the game adaptation "does a fine job of capturing all the elements that have made the TV show such a phenomenon". Calling it "trash that does more harm to the property than good", Digitally Downloaded said Stranger Things 3: The Game "take[s] every major event of the television show, and turn[s] it into a mind-numbing fetch quest". They described the combat as "universally awful" and the puzzles as "painfully generic". NintendoWorldReport criticized performance problems on the Switch and wrote, "Don't tarnish your memories of the third season by playing this."
