= Boss Fight Entertainment =

American video game company

- Type: Subsidiary
- Industry: Video games
- Predecessor: Zynga Dallas
- Founded: June 2013; 13 years ago
- Defunct: October 2025; 1 year ago
- Headquarters: Allen, Texas, US
- Number of locations: 3 (2025)
- Key people: David Rippy (chief executive officer); Bill Jackson (chief creative officer); Scott Winsett (chief operating officer); Stephen Rippy (composer); Dave Luehmann (director of game development)
- Number of employees: 130 (2025)
- Parent: Netflix (2022–2025)
- Website: bossfightentertainment.com

Boss Fight Entertainment was an American video game development company based in Allen, Texas, with a second studio based in Austin, Texas. Boss Fight was formed by former Zynga Dallas and Ensemble Studios employees in June 2013. In late 2025, Netflix dissolved Boss Fight Entertainment.

== History ==
Boss Fight Entertainment was founded by David Rippy, Scott Winsett, and Bill Jackson following the closure of Zynga's Dallas studio in June 2013.

In September 2014, Boss Fight announced that they were working on a game called Dungeon Boss. Big Fish Games was announced as Dungeon Boss's publisher in March 2014.

In May 2015, former Amazon Game Studios director Dave Luehmann joined Boss Fight Entertainment as VP of Production. Boss Fight opened an office in Austin, Texas in July 2015.

In March 2022, the studio was acquired by Netflix as part of Netflix's venture into video game offerings.

=== Closure ===
In late 2025, Netflix dissolved Boss Fight Entertainment. The studio's closure, which involved staff layoffs, followed the release and commercial success of its flagship title, the mobile game Squid Game: Unleashed, a product that had reached the number one position on mobile app charts in over 100 countries. The dissolution of Boss Fight Entertainment, which had been acquired in 2022, was interpreted by industry commentators as indicative of a strategic consolidation within the Netflix Games division. This action, following the closure of the company's internal AAA studio (Team Blue), suggested a corporate pivot toward emphasizing third-party partnerships, licensed intellectual property, and TV-integrated party games over costly in-house development. Despite the closure of the studio, its previously released titles are slated to remain available on the Netflix platform for subscribers.

Following the closure of the studio, several core members from Boss Fight went on to form the independent developer Sunwise Games. In March 2026, the founders of Boss Fight Entertainment announced that they had established a new independent studio under the Bossfight name.

== Games ==
Release date	Title	Platform(s)	Genre	References
March 15, 2021	myVEGAS Bingo	iOS; Android	Social Casino/Bingo	
September 7, 2015	Dungeon Boss	iOS; Android	Collectible RPG	
May 31, 2023	Dungeon Boss: Respawned	iOS; Android	Collectible RPG	
September 13, 2023	Netflix Stories	iOS; Android	Visual novel	
January 4, 2024	Money Heist: Ultimate Choice	iOS; Android	Visual novel	
December 17, 2024	Squid Game: Unleashed	iOS; Android	Party	

== Office ==
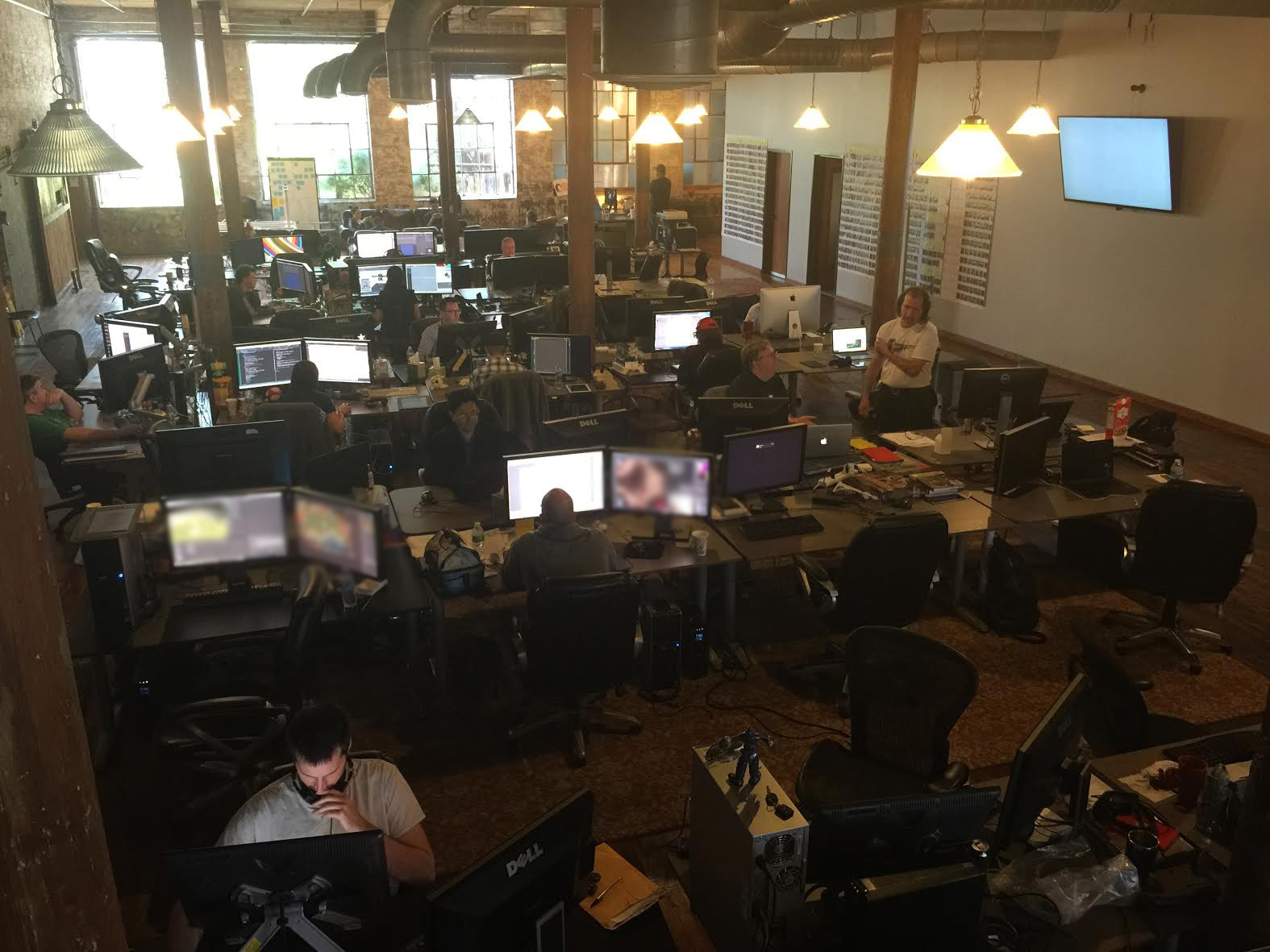
Boss Fight's offices at the Cotton Mill in McKinney, TX

Boss Fight's McKinney office was initially located at the newly renovated "Cotton Mill", which is listed in the National Register of Historic Places listings in Collin County, Texas. Their new headquarters is located in Allen, just north of the Watters Shopping district.

Boss Fight has two studios, with one in Austin, Texas and the other in Seattle, Washington.
