= Martin Vechev =

Bulgarian computer scientist

- Мартин Вечев
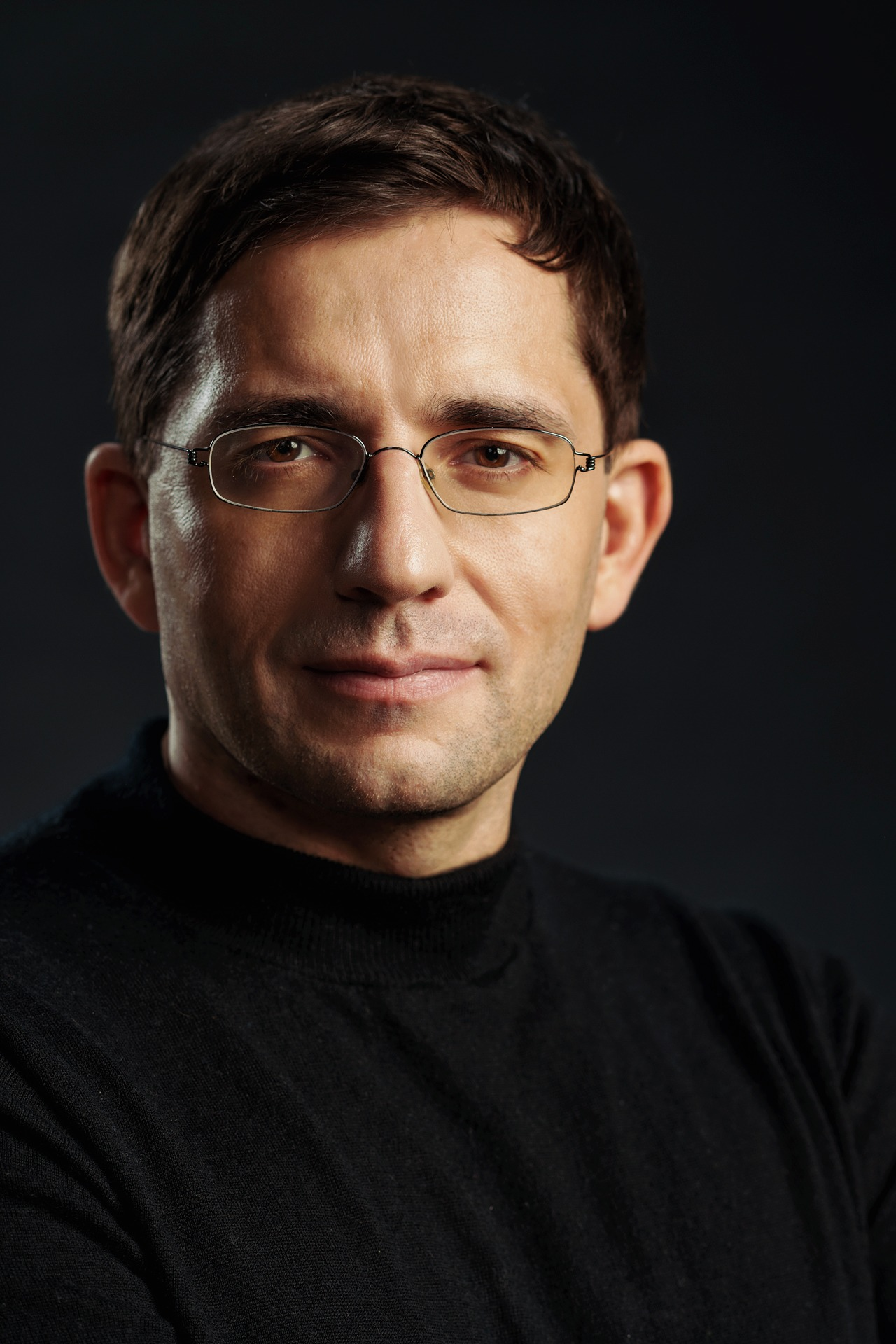
- Professor Martin Vechev
- Born: 24 July 1977 (age 49); Sofia, Bulgaria
- Education: University of Cambridge; Simon Fraser University
- Known for: Machine learning for code (BigCode), Robust and Trustworthy AI, Quantum Programming, Silq Programming Language
- Awards: ACM SIGPLAN Robin Milner Young Researcher Award 2019; John Atanasoff Award; ERC Consolidator Grant; ERC Starting Grant; IBM Extraordinary Accomplishment Award
- Scientific career
- Fields: Programming Languages, Machine Learning, Security
- Workplaces: ETH Zurich; INSAIT; IBM Research
- Doctoral advisor: Martin Richards (computer scientist)
- Website: https://www.sri.inf.ethz.ch/people/martin https://insait.ai/prof-martin-vechev/

Martin Vechev (born 24 July 1977) is a full professor at the department of computer science at ETH Zurich, working in the fields of programming languages, machine learning and computer security. He leads the Secure, Reliable, and Intelligent Systems Lab (SRI), part of the Department of Computer Science.

Vechev is the founder, architect and Scientific Director of INSAIT - Institute for Computer Science, Artificial Intelligence and Technology, a research center in computer science and artificial intelligence in Eastern Europe, created in partnership with ETH Zurich and EPFL.

He is known for his works in machine learning for code (BigCode), where he introduced statistical programming engines trained on large codebases, reliable and trustworthy artificial intelligence, where he introduced abstract interpretation methods for reasoning about deep neural networks to enable the verification of large machine learning models, and quantum programming, introducing the first high-level programming language and system Silq.

Vechev received the ACM SIGPLAN Robin Milner Young Researcher Award in 2019. He was awarded an ERC Consolidator Grant in 2021 for research focusing on safe and trustworthy AI, and a ERC Starting Grant, which contributed to shape the area of AI for code. Vechev has co-authored over 170 research publications, several of which have been recognized with best or distinguished paper awards.

Prior to starting at ETH Zurich in 2012, Vechev was a Research Staff Member at the IBM T.J. Watson Research Center in New York, US from 2007 to 2011.

== Advised doctoral students ==
Vechev has supervised and graduated 21 doctoral students at ETH Zurich. Several of his Ph.D. students received major recognitions for their dissertations. Veselin Raychev received an Honorable Mention for the ACM Doctoral Dissertation Award and the ETH medal. Gagandeep Singh received the ACM SIGPLAN Doctoral Dissertation Award. Samuel Steffen was awarded the ACM SIGSAC Doctoral Dissertation Award Runner-Up. Benjamin Bichsel received both the ACM SIGPLAN John C. Reynolds Doctoral Dissertation Award and the ETH medal on the topic of 'High-Level Quantum Programming'. Timon Gehr received the ETH medal. Rüdiger Birkner was awarded the 2022 EuroSys Roger Needham Ph.D. Award. Dimitar K. Dimitrov received the ETH medal.

== Early life and education ==
Martin Vechev was born in Sofia, Bulgaria, where he attended the Sofia High School of Mathematics (SMG) from 1991 to 1994. He received a B.Sc. in Computer Science from Simon Fraser University in 2001 and a Ph.D. in computer science from the University of Cambridge in 2008.

== Serial entrepreneurship ==
Vechev has also co-founded 6 deep tech start-ups:

- LatticeFlow, building a platform for delivering robust and trustworthy AI systems
- DeepCode, an AI-based code review system, acquired by the security unicorn Snyk in 2020
- ChainSecurity, smart contract security audits based on formal mathematical guarantees, acquired by PwC Switzerland in 2020
- NetFabric, focused on AI-based network monitoring
- Invariant Labs, dedicated to developing advanced security solutions for autonomous AI agents, acquired by Snyk in 2025
- and LogicStar, a company developing AI agents that autonomously resolve bugs

== Awards ==
Vechev's work has been recognized by many international awards, including:

- ACM SIGPLAN Robin Milner Young Researcher Award in 2019 for major contributions to the area of programming languages
- ACM SIGPLAN Research Highlight
- CACM Research Highlight 2016
- ERC Consolidator Grant 2021 for the project SafeAI: Certified Safe, Fair and Robust Artificial Intelligence
- ERC Starting Grant for the project BIGCODE, the first to combine advanced programming languages and machine learning techniques, which developed new AI-based methods for creating and debugging software
- John Atanasoff Award 2009, awarded by the President of Bulgaria
- Google and Facebook Faculty Research Awards
- IBM Research Division Award
- IBM Extraordinary Accomplishment Award (awarded by John Kelly, IBM Senior Vice President and Director of IBM Research)
- IBM Research Outstanding Project Award
- IBM Invention and Outstanding Technical Achievement Awards
