= Martin Richards (computer scientist) =

British computer scientist (born 1940)

- Born: 21 July 1940 (age 86)
- Education: University of Cambridge
- Known for: Basic Combined Programming Language
- Awards: IEEE Computer Pioneer Award (2003)
- Scientific career
- Fields: Programming languages
- Workplaces: University of Cambridge Computer Laboratory
- Thesis: The design and implementation of CPL-like programming languages (1967)
- Doctoral advisor: David Barron, David Park and Christopher Strachey
- Doctoral students: Eben Upton; Martin Vechev
- Website: www.cl.cam.ac.uk/~mr10

Martin Richards (born 21 July 1940) is a British computer scientist known for his development of the BCPL programming language which is both part of early research into portable software, and the ancestor of the B programming language invented by Ken Thompson in early versions of Unix and which Dennis Ritchie in turn used as the basis of his widely used C programming language.

== Education ==
Richards studied mathematics as an undergraduate student at the University of Cambridge and took the Cambridge Diploma in Computer Science. His PhD was on programming language design and implementation. He was a senior lecturer at the University of Cambridge Computer Laboratory until his retirement in 2007.

== Research ==
In addition to BCPL, Richards' work includes the development of the TRIPOS portable operating system.

He was awarded the IEEE Computer Society's Computer Pioneer Award in 2003 for "pioneering system software portability through the programming language BCPL".

Richards is a fellow of St John's College at the University of Cambridge.
