= SiteGround =

Web hosting provider

SiteGround Hosting Ltd.
- Company type: Privately held company
- Industry: Web hosting
- Founded: March 22, 2004; 22 years ago
- Founder: Ivo Tzenov
- Headquarters: Sofia, Bulgaria
- Revenue: 237,839,000 Bulgarian lev (2022)
- Net income: 143,211,000 Bulgarian lev (2022)
- Total assets: 345,667,000 Bulgarian lev (2022)
- Number of employees: 600+
- Website: www.siteground.com

SiteGround is a web hosting company, founded in 2004 in Sofia, Bulgaria. As of April 2023, it provides hosting for over 3,000,000 domains worldwide. It provides shared hosting, cloud hosting, enterprise solutions, email hosting, and domain registration. According to W3Techs, SiteGround is used as hosting provider by 2.4% of all websites. In 2019, the company employed about 500 people. It has offices in Sofia, Plovdiv, Stara Zagora and Madrid.

== History ==
SiteGround was founded in 2004 in Sofia by a few university friends. In January 2015, Joomla partnered with SiteGround to offer free websites hosted on Joomla.com.

== Server infrastructure and setup ==
According to the company's website, in May 2023, it had 11 data centers in 8 countries: the United States, the Netherlands, UK, Germany, France, Spain, Australia and Singapore. SiteGround runs CentOS, Apache, Nginx, MySQL, PHP, WHM and its in-house developed control panel – Site Tools on its servers. In 2020, SiteGround migrated all of its domains to Google Cloud, and all data is stored on Google's SSD persistent storage.

== Products and services ==
SiteGround provides quality web hosting services for WordPress, Joomla, Magento, Drupal, PrestaShop and WooCommerce websites. It also has a Weebly connector. A September 18, 2020, review by PCMag.com praised SiteGround for their strong uptime and customer support, but rated them 3.5/5 overall, before major price increases in 2021 and 2022.
