= Netflix, Inc. =

American media company

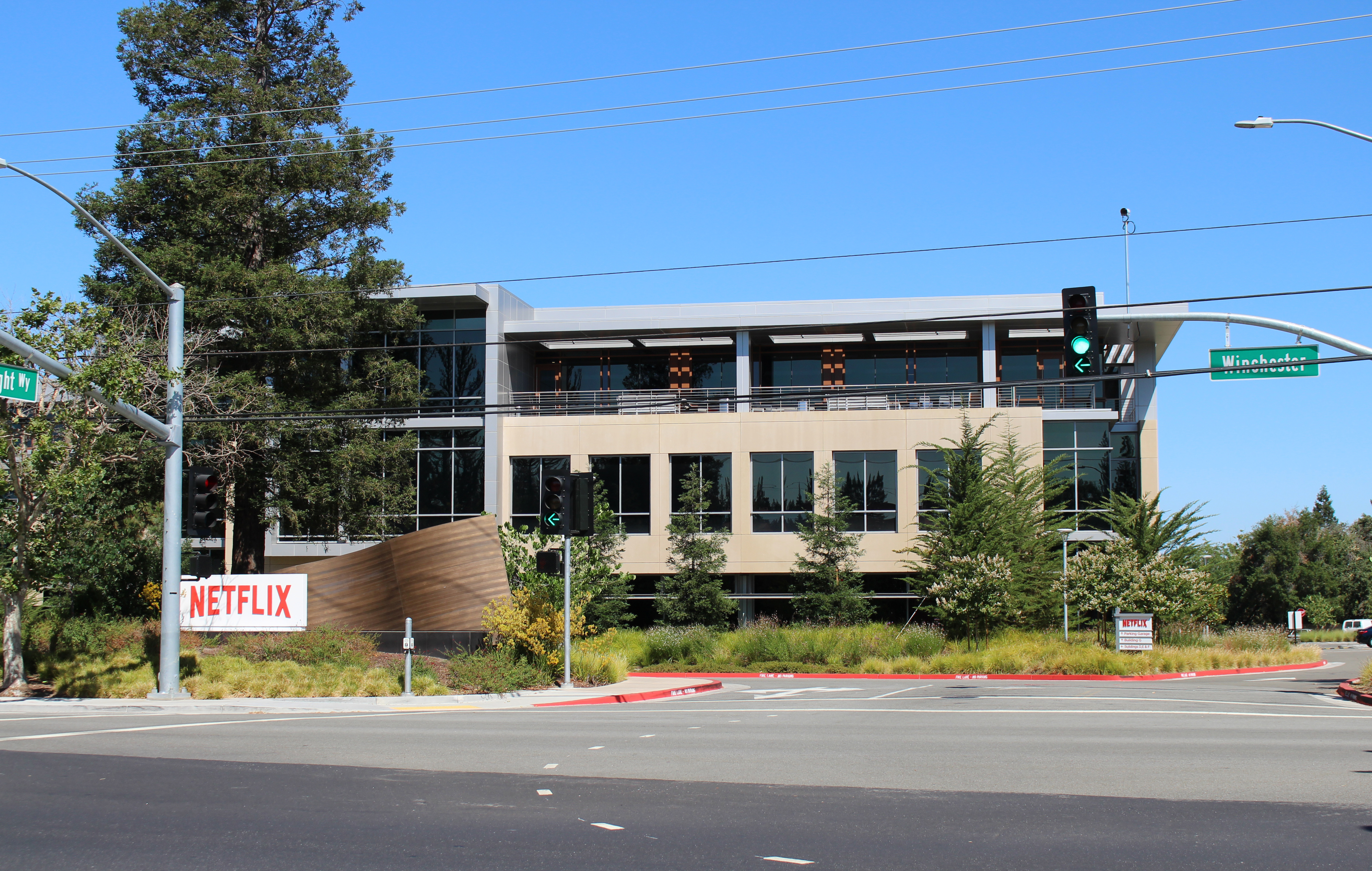
- Headquarters in Los Gatos, California, in 2019
- Type: Public
- Traded as: Nasdaq: NFLX; Nasdaq-100 component; S&P 100 component; S&P 500 component
- ISIN: US64110L1061
- Industry: Media; Entertainment
- Founded: August 29, 1997; 29 years ago
- Founders: Reed Hastings; Marc Randolph
- Headquarters: Los Gatos, California, U.S.
- Key people: Jay Hoag (Chairman); Ted Sarandos (co-CEO); Greg Peters (co-CEO)
- Products: Comic books; Films; Music; Television shows; Video games; Web portals; Home media; Digital distribution; Amusement Parks
- Brands: Netflix
- Services: Streaming; Television
- Revenue: ▲US$45.2 billion (2025)
- Operating income: ▲US$13.3 billion (2025)
- Net income: ▲US$11.0 billion (2025)
- Total assets: ▲US$55.6 billion (2025)
- Total equity: ▲US$26.6 billion (2025)
- Number of employees: c. 16,000 (2025)
- Divisions: Domestic and International Streaming
- Subsidiaries: Sunset Bronson Studios; Albuquerque Studios; London Shepperton Studios; Madrid Tres Cantos Studios; Vancouver Martini Studios; Toronto Pinewood/Cinespace Studios; Netflix Animation Studios; Netflix Music; Fast.com; Millarworld; StoryBots, Inc.; Grauman's Egyptian Theatre; Broke and Bones (stake); Roald Dahl Story Company; Netflix Pty Ltd; Eyeline; Next Games; InterPositive; Fort Monmouth Studios; Netflix House
- Website: about.netflix.com

Netflix, Inc. is an American media company founded on August 29, 1997, by Reed Hastings and Marc Randolph in Scotts Valley, California, and currently based in Los Gatos, California, with production offices and stages at the Los Angeles–based Hollywood studios (formerly old Warner Brothers studios) and the Albuquerque Studios (formerly ABQ studios). It owns and operates an eponymous over-the-top subscription video on-demand service, which showcases acquired and original programming as well as third-party content licensed from other production companies and distributors. Netflix is also the first streaming media company to be a member of the Motion Picture Association.

Netflix initially both sold and rented DVDs by mail, but the sales were eliminated within a year to focus on the DVD rental business. In 2007, Netflix introduced streaming media and video on demand. The company expanded to Canada in 2010, followed by Latin America and the Caribbean. In 2011, the service began to acquire and produce original content, beginning with the crime drama Lilyhammer.

The company has been listed on Nasdaq since 2002 and is ranked 117th on the Fortune 500 and 219th on the Forbes Global 2000. It is the largest entertainment/media company by market capitalization as of 2026 estimated at $450 billion. In 2021, Netflix was ranked as the eighth-most trusted brand globally by Morning Consult. During the 2010s, Netflix was the top-performing stock in the S&P 500 stock market index, with a total return of 3,693%.

The company has two CEOs, Greg Peters and Ted Sarandos, who are split between Los Gatos and Los Angeles, respectively. It also operates international offices in Asia, Europe and Latin America including in Canada, France, Brazil, the Netherlands, India, Italy, Japan, Poland, South Korea, and the United Kingdom. The company has production hubs in Los Angeles, Albuquerque, London, Madrid, Vancouver and Toronto.

== History ==
Netflix logo history

First logo, used from 1997 to 2000

Second logo, used from 2000 to 2001

Third logo, used from 2001 to 2014

Fourth and current logo, used since 2014

=== Launch as a mail-based rental business (1997–2006) ===
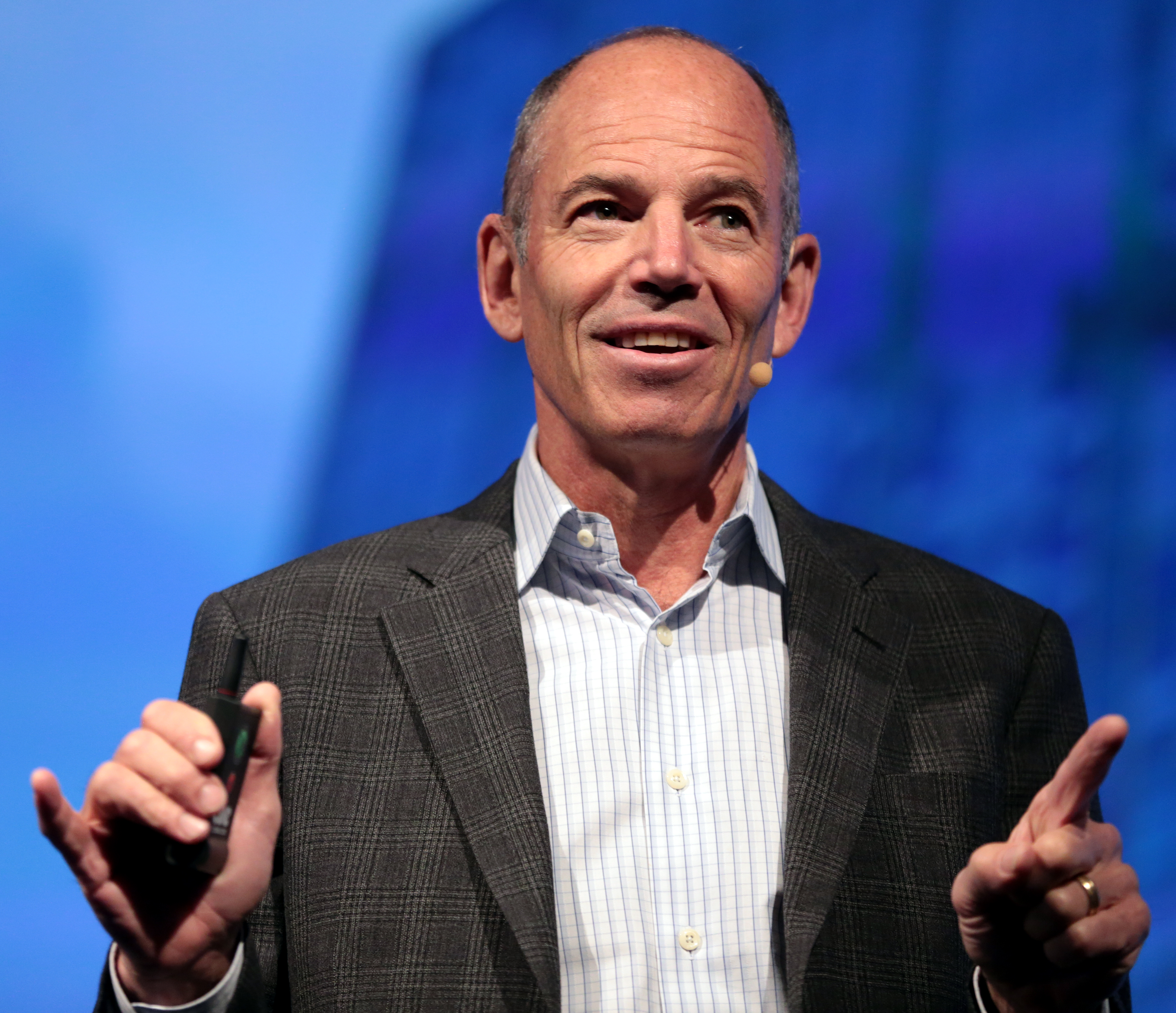
Marc Randolph, co-founder of Netflix and the first CEO of the company

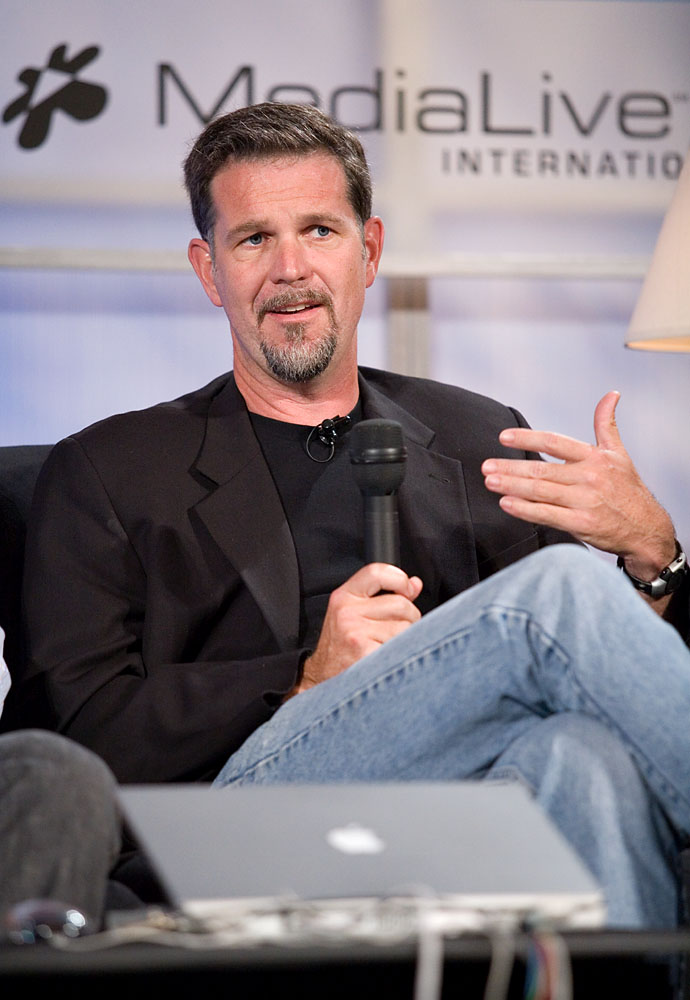
Reed Hastings, co-founder and former chairman

Netflix was founded by Marc Randolph and Reed Hastings on August 29, 1997, in Scotts Valley, California. Hastings, a computer scientist and mathematician, was a cofounder of Pure Software, which was acquired by Rational Software that year for $750 million, the then biggest acquisition in Silicon Valley history. Randolph had worked as a marketing director for Pure Software after Pure Atria acquired a company where Randolph worked. He was previously a co-founder of MicroWarehouse, a computer mail-order company as well as vice president of marketing for Borland. Hastings and Randolph came up with the idea for Netflix while carpooling between their homes in Santa Cruz, California, and Pure Atria's headquarters in Sunnyvale. Patty McCord, later head of human resources at Netflix, was also in the carpool group. Randolph admired Amazon and wanted to find a large category of portable items to sell over the Internet using a similar model. Hastings and Randolph considered and rejected selling and renting VHS as too expensive to stock and too delicate to ship. When they heard about DVDs, first introduced in the United States in early 1997, they tested the concept of selling or renting DVDs by mail by mailing a compact disc to Hastings's house in Santa Cruz. When the disc arrived intact, they decided to enter the $16 billion home video sales and rental industry. Hastings is often quoted saying that he decided to start Netflix after being fined $40 at a Blockbuster store for being late to return a copy of Apollo 13, a claim since repudiated by Randolph. Hastings invested $2.5 million into Netflix from the sale of Pure Atria. Netflix launched as the first DVD rental and sales website with 30 employees and 925 titles available—nearly all DVDs published. Randolph and Hastings met with Jeff Bezos, where Amazon offered to acquire Netflix for between $14 and $16 million. Fearing competition from Amazon, Randolph at first thought the offer was fair, but Hastings, who owned 70% of the company, turned it down on the plane ride home.

Initially, Netflix offered a per-rental model for each DVD but introduced a monthly subscription concept in September 1999. The per-rental model was dropped by early 2000, allowing the company to focus on the business model of flat-fee unlimited rentals without due dates, late fees, shipping and handling fees, or per-title rental fees. In September 2000, during the dot-com bubble, while Netflix was suffering losses, Hastings and Randolph offered to sell the company to Blockbuster for $50 million. John Antioco, CEO of Blockbuster, thought the offer was a joke and declined, saying, "The dot-com hysteria is completely overblown." While Netflix experienced fast growth in early 2001, the continued effects of the dot-com bubble collapse and the September 11 attacks caused the company to hold off plans for its initial public offering (IPO) and to lay off one-third of its 120 employees.

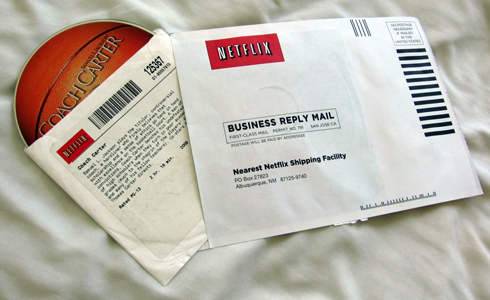
Opened Netflix rental envelope containing a DVD copy of Coach Carter (2005)

DVD players were a popular gift for holiday sales in late 2001, and demand for DVD subscription services were "growing like crazy", according to chief talent officer Patty McCord. The company went public on NASDAQ under the ticker symbol NFLX on May 29, 2002, selling 5.5 million shares of common stock at US$15.00 per share. In 2003, Netflix was issued a patent by the U.S. Patent and Trademark Office to cover its subscription rental service and several extensions. Netflix posted its first profit in 2003, earning $6.5 million on revenues of $272 million; by 2004, profit had increased to $49 million on over $500 million in revenues. In 2005, 35,000 different films were available, and Netflix shipped 1 million DVDs out every day.

In 2004, Blockbuster introduced a DVD rental service, which not only allowed users to check out titles through online sites but allowed for them to return them at brick and-mortar stores. By 2006, Blockbuster's service reached two million users, and while trailing Netflix's subscriber count, was drawing business away from Netflix. Netflix lowered fees in 2007. While it was an urban legend that Netflix ultimately "killed" Blockbuster in the DVD rental market, Blockbuster's debt load and internal disagreements hurt the company.

On April 4, 2006, Netflix filed a patent infringement lawsuit in which it demanded a jury trial in the U.S. District Court for the Northern District of California, alleging that Blockbuster's online DVD rental subscription program violated two patents held by Netflix. The first cause of action alleged Blockbuster's infringement of copying the "dynamic queue" of DVDs available for each customer, Netflix's method of using the ranked preferences in the queue to send DVDs to subscribers, and Netflix's method permitting the queue to be updated and reordered. The second cause of action alleged infringement of the subscription rental service as well as Netflix's methods of communication and delivery. The companies settled their dispute on June 25, 2007; terms were not disclosed.

On October 1, 2006, Netflix announced the Netflix Prize, $1,000,000 to the first developer of a video recommendation algorithm that could beat its existing algorithm Cinematch, at predicting customer ratings by more than 10%. On September 21, 2009, it awarded the $1,000,000 prize to team "BellKor's Pragmatic Chaos". Cinematch, launched in 2000, is a recommendation system that recommended movies to its users, many of which they might not ever had heard of before.

Through its division Red Envelope Entertainment, Netflix licensed and distributed independent films such as Born into Brothels and Sherrybaby. In late 2006, Red Envelope Entertainment also expanded into producing original content with filmmakers such as John Waters. Netflix closed Red Envelope Entertainment in 2008.

=== Transition to streaming services (2007–2012) ===
In January 2007, the company launched a streaming media service, introducing video on demand via the Internet. However, at that time it only had 1,000 films available for streaming, compared to 70,000 available on DVD. The company had for some time considered offering movies online, but it was only in the mid-2000s that data speeds and bandwidth costs had improved sufficiently to allow customers to download movies from the net. The original idea was a "Netflix box" that could download movies overnight, and be ready to watch the next day. By 2005, Netflix had acquired movie rights and designed the box and service. But after witnessing how popular streaming services such as YouTube were despite the lack of high-definition content, the concept of using a hardware device was scrapped and replaced with a streaming concept.

In February 2007, Netflix delivered its billionth DVD, a copy of Babel to a customer in Texas. In April 2007, Netflix recruited ReplayTV founder Anthony Wood, to build a "Netflix Player" that would allow streaming content to be played directly on a television rather than a desktop or laptop. Hastings eventually shut down the project to help encourage other hardware manufacturers to include built-in Netflix support, which would be spun off as the digital media player product Roku.

In January 2008, all rental-disc subscribers became entitled to unlimited streaming at no additional cost. This change came in a response to the introduction of Hulu and to Apple's new video-rental services. In August 2008, the Netflix database was corrupted and the company was not able to ship DVDs to customers for 3 days, leading the company to move all its data to the Amazon Web Services cloud. In November 2008, Netflix began offering subscribers rentals on Blu-ray and discontinued its sale of used DVDs. In 2009, Netflix streams overtook DVD shipments.

On January 6, 2010, Netflix agreed with Warner Bros. to delay new release rentals 28 days prior to retail, in an attempt to help studios sell physical copies, and similar deals involving Universal Pictures and 20th Century Fox were reached on April 9. In July 2010, Netflix signed a deal to stream movies of Relativity Media. In August 2010, Netflix reached a five-year deal worth nearly $1 billion to stream films from Paramount, Lionsgate and Metro-Goldwyn-Mayer. The deal increased Netflix's annual spending fees, adding roughly $200 million per year. It spent $117 million in the first six months of 2010 on streaming, up from $31 million in 2009. On September 22, 2010, Netflix launched in Canada, its first international market. In November 2010, Netflix began offering a standalone streaming service separate from DVD rentals.

In 2010, Netflix acquired the rights to Breaking Bad, produced by Sony Pictures Television, after the show's third season, at a point where original broadcaster AMC had expressed the possibility of cancelling the show. Sony pushed Netflix to release Breaking Bad in time for the fourth season, which as a result greatly expanded the show's audience on AMC due to new viewers binging on the Netflix past episodes, and doubling the viewership by the time of the fifth season. Breaking Bad is considered the first such show to have this "Netflix effect".

In January 2011, Netflix announced agreements with several manufacturers to include branded Netflix buttons on the remote controls of devices compatible with the service, such as Blu-ray players. By May 2011, Netflix had become the largest source of Internet streaming traffic in North America, accounting for 30% of traffic during peak hours.

On July 12, 2011, Netflix announced that it would separate its existing subscription plans into two separate plans: one covering the streaming and the other DVD rental services. The cost for streaming would be $7.99 per month, while DVD rental would start at the same price. On September 11, 2011, Netflix expanded to 43 countries in Latin America. On September 18, 2011, Netflix announced its intentions to rebrand and restructure its DVD home media rental service as an independent subsidiary called Qwikster, separating DVD rental and streaming services. On September 26, 2011, Netflix announced a content deal with DreamWorks Animation. On October 10, 2011, Netflix announced that it would retain its DVD service under the name Netflix and that its streaming and DVD-rental plans would remain branded together.

On January 9, 2012, Netflix started its expansion to Europe, launching in the United Kingdom and Ireland. In February 2012, Netflix reached a multi-year agreement with The Weinstein Company. In March 2012, Netflix acquired the domain name DVD.com. By 2016, Netflix rebranded its DVD-by-mail service under the name DVD.com, A Netflix Company. In April 2012, Netflix filed with the Federal Election Commission (FEC) to form a political action committee (PAC) called FLIXPAC. Netflix spokesperson Joris Evers tweeted that the intent was to "engage on issues like net neutrality, bandwidth caps, UBB and VPPA". In June 2012, Netflix signed a deal with Open Road Films.

On August 23, 2012, Netflix and The Weinstein Company signed a multi-year output deal for RADiUS-TWC films. In August 2010, Epix signed a five-year streaming deal with Netflix. For the initial two years of this agreement, first-run and back-catalog content from Epix was exclusive to Netflix. Epix films came to Netflix 90 days after premiering on Epix. These included films from Paramount, Metro-Goldwyn-Mayer and Lionsgate.

On October 18, 2012, Netflix launched in Denmark, Finland, Norway and Sweden. On December 4, 2012, Netflix and Disney announced an exclusive multi-year agreement for first-run United States subscription television rights to Walt Disney Studios' animated and live-action films, with classics such as Dumbo, Alice in Wonderland and Pocahontas available immediately and others available on Netflix beginning in 2016. Direct-to-video releases were made available in 2013.

On January 14, 2013, Netflix signed an agreement with Time Warner's Turner Broadcasting System and Warner Bros. Television to distribute Cartoon Network, Warner Bros. Animation, and Adult Swim content, as well as TNT's Dallas, beginning in March 2013. The rights to these programs were given to Netflix shortly after deals with Viacom to stream Nickelodeon and Nick Jr. Channel programs expired.

For cost reasons, Netflix stated that it would limit its expansion in 2013, adding only one new market—the Netherlands—in September of that year. This expanded its availability to 40 territories.

=== Development of original programming (2013–2017) ===
Netflix began efforts to develop original content in 2011; in March, Netflix made a straight-to-series order for the Kevin Spacey-led political drama House of Cards from MRC. Beating out other U.S. cable networks, it marked the first first-run television series to be specifically commissioned by the service. In November 2011, Netflix then ordered Orange is the New Black, a comedy-drama adapted from Piper Kerman's memoir of the same name, and a new season of the cancelled Fox sitcom Arrested Development. Netflix also acquired U.S. rights to the Norwegian drama Lilyhammer; following its television premiere on Norway's NRK1 on January 25, 2012, the entirety of its first season was released by Netflix on February 8—a notable departure from the broadcast television model of premiering episodes on a weekly basis.

House of Cards was released by Netflix on February 1, 2013, marketed as the first "Netflix Original" production. Later that month, Netflix announced an agreement with DreamWorks Animation to commission children's television series based on its properties, beginning with Turbo: F.A.S.T., a spin-off of its film Turbo. Orange is the New Black would premiere in July 2013; Netflix stated that Orange is the New Black had been its most-watched original series so far, with all of them having "an audience comparable with successful shows on cable and broadcast TV."

On March 13, 2013, Netflix added a Facebook sharing feature, letting United States subscribers access "Watched by your friends" and "Friends' Favorites" by agreeing. This was not legal until the Video Privacy Protection Act was modified in early 2013. On August 1, 2013, Netflix reintroduced the "Profiles" feature that permits accounts to accommodate up to five user profiles.

In November 2013, Marvel Television and ABC Studios announced Netflix had ordered a slate of four television series based on the Marvel Comics characters Daredevil, Jessica Jones, Iron Fist and Luke Cage. Each of the four series received an initial order of 13 episodes, and Netflix also ordered a Defenders miniseries that would tie them together. Daredevil and Jessica Jones premiered in 2015. The Luke Cage series premiered on September 30, 2016, followed by Iron Fist on March 17, 2017, and The Defenders on August 18, 2017. Marvel owner Disney later entered into other content agreements with Netflix, including acquiring its animated Star Wars series Star Wars: The Clone Wars, and a new sixth season.

In February 2014, Netflix began to enter into agreements with U.S. internet service providers, beginning with Comcast (whose customers had repeatedly complained of frequent buffering when streaming Netflix), to provide the service a direct connection to their networks. In April 2014, Netflix signed Arrested Development creator Mitchell Hurwitz and his production firm The Hurwitz Company to a multi-year deal to create original projects for the service. In May 2014, Netflix acquired streaming rights to films produced by Sony Pictures Animation. It also quietly began to introduce an updated logo, with a flatter appearance and updated typography.

In September 2014, Netflix expanded into six new European markets, including Austria, Belgium, France, Germany, Luxembourg, and Switzerland. On September 10, 2014, Netflix participated in Internet Slowdown Day by deliberately slowing down its speed in support of net neutrality regulations in the United States. In October 2014, Netflix announced a four-film deal with Adam Sandler and his Happy Madison Productions.

In April 2015, following the launch of Daredevil, Netflix director of content operations Tracy Wright announced that Netflix had added support for audio description (a narration track with aural descriptions of key visual elements for the blind or visually impaired), and had begun to work with its partners to add descriptions to its other original series over time. The following year, as part of a settlement with the American Council of the Blind, Netflix agreed to provide descriptions for its original series within 30 days of their premiere, and add screen reader support and the ability to browse content by availability of descriptions.

In March 2015, Netflix expanded to Australia and New Zealand. In September 2015, Netflix launched in Japan, its first country in Asia. In October 2015, Netflix launched in Italy, Portugal, and Spain.

In January 2016, at the Consumer Electronics Show, Netflix announced a major international expansion of its service into 130 additional countries. It then had become available worldwide except China, Syria, North Korea, Kosovo and Crimea. In May 2016, Netflix created a tool called Fast.com to determine the speed of an Internet connection. It received praise for being "simple" and "easy to use", and does not include online advertising, unlike competitors. On November 30, 2016, Netflix launched an offline playback feature, allowing users of the Netflix mobile apps on Android or iOS to cache content on their devices in standard or high quality for viewing offline, without an Internet connection.

In 2016, Netflix released an estimated 126 original series or films, more than any other network or cable channel. In April 2016, Hastings stated that the company planned to expand its in-house, Los Angeles-based Netflix Studios to grow its output; Hastings ruled out any potential acquisitions of existing studios, stating that "It's been 15 years we've been public and 20 years existing, and we've done no [mergers and acquisitions]. So I think that probably speaks for itself."

In February 2017, Netflix signed a music publishing deal with BMG Rights Management, whereby BMG will oversee rights outside of the United States for music associated with Netflix original content. Netflix continues to handle these tasks in-house in the United States. On April 25, 2017, Netflix signed a licensing deal with IQiyi, a Chinese video streaming platform owned by Baidu, to allow selected Netflix original content to be distributed in China on the platform.

On August 7, 2017, Netflix acquired Millarworld, the creator-owned publishing company of comic book writer Mark Millar. The purchase marked the first corporate acquisition to have been made by Netflix. On August 14, 2017, Netflix entered into an exclusive development deal with Shonda Rhimes and her production company Shondaland.

In September 2017, Netflix announced it would offer its low-broadband mobile technology to airlines to provide better in-flight Wi-Fi so that passengers can watch movies on Netflix while on planes.

In September 2017, Minister of Heritage Mélanie Joly announced that Netflix had agreed to make a CA$500 million (US$400 million) investment over the next five years in producing content in Canada. The company denied that the deal was intended to result in a tax break. Netflix realized this goal by December 2018.

In October 2017, Netflix iterated a goal of having half of its library consist of original content by 2019, announcing a plan to invest $8 billion on original content in 2018. There will be a particular focus on films and anime through this investment, with a plan to produce 80 original films and 30 anime series. In October 2017, Netflix introduced the "Skip Intro" feature which allows customers to skip the intros to shows on its platform through a variety of techniques including manual reviewing, audio tagging, and machine learning.

In November 2017, Netflix signed an exclusive multi-year deal with Orange Is the New Black creator Jenji Kohan. In November 2017, Netflix withdrew from co-hosting a party at the 75th Golden Globe Awards with The Weinstein Company due to the Harvey Weinstein sexual abuse cases.

=== Expansion into international productions (2017–2020) ===
Icon used since 2016

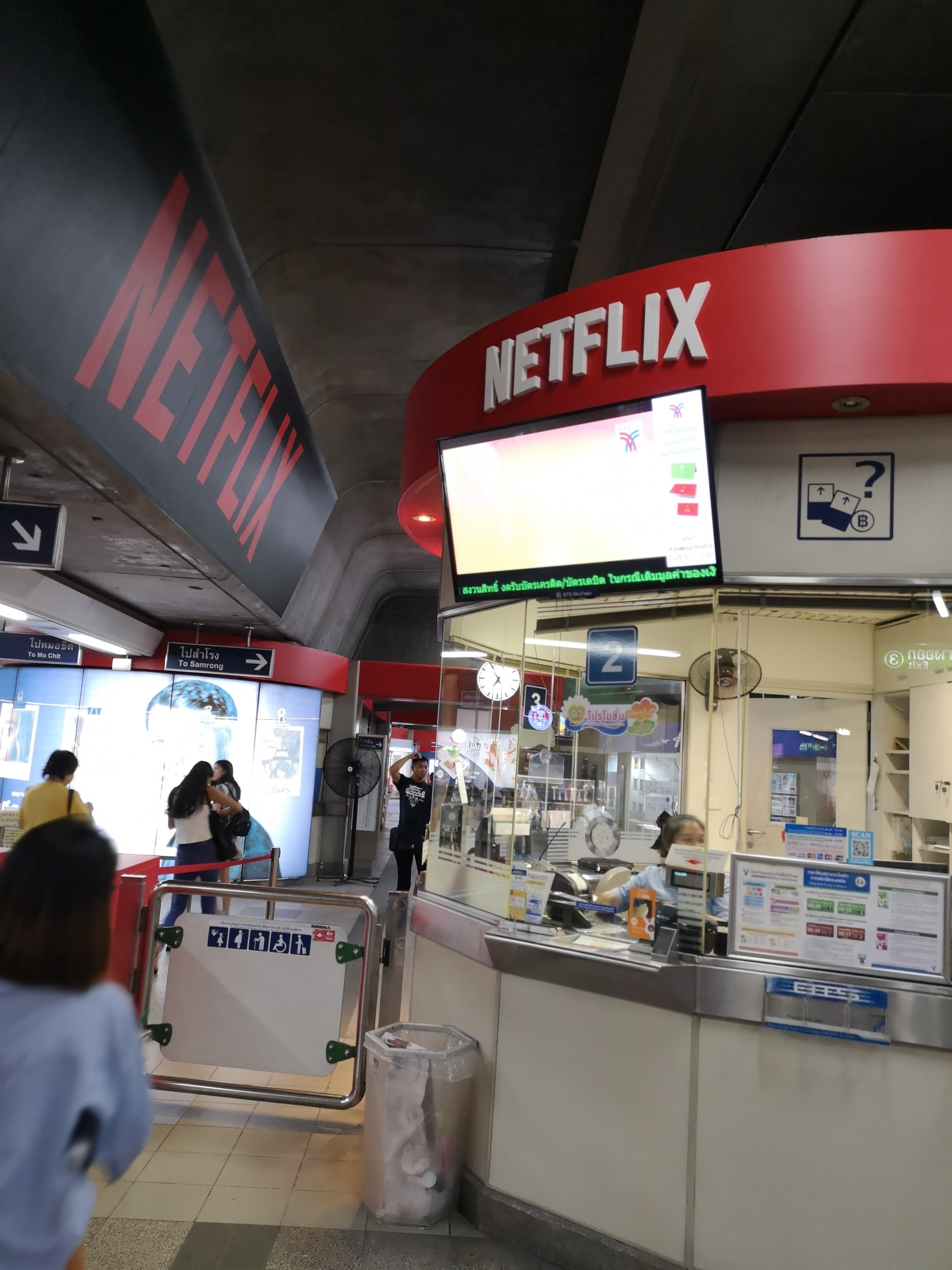
Netflix advertising at Thong Lo BTS station, Bangkok

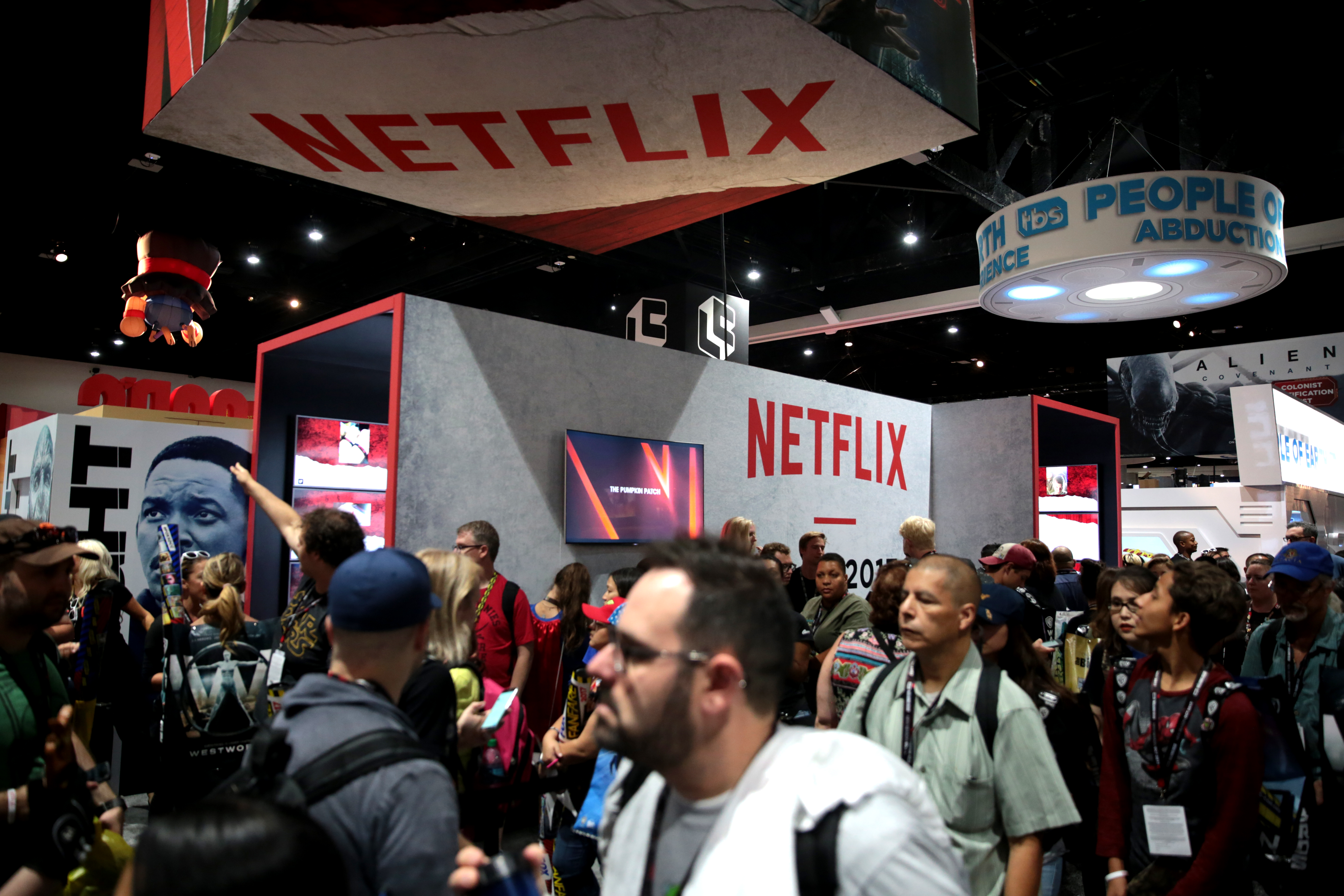
Netflix's booth at the 2017 San Diego Comic-Con

In November 2017, Netflix announced that it would be making its first original Colombian series, to be executive produced by Ciro Guerra. In December 2017, Netflix signed Stranger Things director-producer Shawn Levy and his production company 21 Laps Entertainment to what sources say is a four-year deal. In 2017, Netflix invested in distributing exclusive stand-up comedy specials from Dave Chappelle, Louis C.K., Chris Rock, Jim Gaffigan, Bill Burr and Jerry Seinfeld.

In February 2018, Netflix acquired the rights to The Cloverfield Paradox from Paramount Pictures for $50 million and launched on its service on February 4, 2018, shortly after airing its first trailer during Super Bowl LII. Analysts believed that Netflix's purchase of the film helped to make the film instantly profitable for Paramount compared to a more traditional theatrical release, while Netflix benefited from the surprise reveal. Other films acquired by Netflix include international distribution for Paramount's Annihilation and Universal's News of the World and worldwide distribution of Universal's Extinction, Warner Bros.' Mowgli: Legend of the Jungle, Paramount's The Lovebirds and 20th Century Studios' The Woman in the Window. In March, the service ordered Formula 1: Drive to Survive, a racing docuseries following teams in the Formula One world championship.

In March 2018, Sky UK announced an agreement with Netflix to integrate Netflix's subscription VOD offering into its pay-TV service. Customers with its high-end Sky Q set-top box and service will be able to see Netflix titles alongside their regular Sky channels. In October 2022, Netflix revealed that its annual revenue from the UK subscribers in 2021 was £1.4bn.

In April 2018, Netflix pulled out of the Cannes Film Festival, in response to new rules requiring competition films to have been released in French theaters. The Cannes premiere of Okja in 2017 was controversial, and led to discussions over the appropriateness of films with simultaneous digital releases being screened at an event showcasing theatrical film; audience members also booed the Netflix production logo at the screening. Netflix's attempts to negotiate to allow a limited release in France were curtailed by organizers, as well as French cultural exception law—where theatrically screened films are legally forbidden from being made available via video-on-demand services until at least 36 months after their release. Besides traditional Hollywood markets as well as from partners like the BBC, Sarandos said the company also looking to expand investments in non-traditional foreign markets due to the growth of viewers outside of North America. At the time, this included programs such as Dark from Germany, Ingobernable from Mexico and 3% from Brazil.

On May 22, 2018, former president, Barack Obama, and his wife, Michelle Obama, signed a deal to produce docu-series, documentaries and features for Netflix under the Obamas' newly formed production company, Higher Ground Productions.

In June 2018, Netflix announced a partnership with Telltale Games to port its adventure games to the service in a streaming video format, allowing simple controls through a television remote. The first game, Minecraft: Story Mode, was released in November 2018. In July 2018, Netflix earned the most Emmy nominations of any network for the first time with 112 nods. On August 27, 2018, the company signed a five-year exclusive overall deal with international best–selling author Harlan Coben. On the same day, the company inked an overall deal with Gravity Falls creator Alex Hirsch. In October 2018, Netflix paid under $30 million to acquire Albuquerque Studios (ABQ Studios), a $91 million film and TV production facility with eight sound stages in Albuquerque, New Mexico, for its first U.S. production hub, pledging to spend over $1 billion over the next decade to create one of the largest film studios in North America. In November 2018, Paramount Pictures signed a multi-picture film deal with Netflix, making Paramount the first major film studio to sign a deal with Netflix. A sequel to AwesomenessTV's To All the Boys I've Loved Before was released on Netflix under the title To All the Boys: P.S. I Still Love You as part of the agreement. In December 2018, the company announced a partnership with ESPN Films on a television documentary chronicling Michael Jordan and the 1997–98 Chicago Bulls season titled The Last Dance. It was released internationally on Netflix and became available for streaming in the United States three months after a broadcast airing on ESPN.

In January 2019, Sex Education made its debut as a Netflix original series with much critical acclaim. On January 22, 2019, Netflix sought and was approved for membership into the Motion Picture Association of America (MPAA), as the first streaming service to become a member of the association. In February 2019, The Haunting creator Mike Flanagan joined frequent collaborator Trevor Macy as a partner in Intrepid Pictures and the duo signed an exclusive overall deal with Netflix to produce television content. On May 9, 2019, Netflix contracted with Dark Horse Entertainment to make television series and films based on comics from Dark Horse Comics. In July 2019, Netflix announced that it would be opening a hub at Shepperton Studios as part of a deal with Pinewood Group. In early-August 2019, Netflix negotiated an exclusive multi-year film and television deal with Game of Thrones creators and showrunners David Benioff and D.B. Weiss. The first Netflix production created by Benioff and Weiss was planned as an adaptation of Liu Cixin's science fiction novel The Three-Body Problem, part of the Remembrance of Earth's Past trilogy. On September 30, 2019, in addition to renewing Stranger Things for a fourth season, Netflix signed The Duffer Brothers to an overall deal covering future film and television projects for the service.

On November 13, 2019, Netflix and Nickelodeon entered into a multi-year agreement to produce several original animated feature films and television series based on Nickelodeon's library of characters. This agreement expanded on their existing relationship, in which new specials based on the past Nickelodeon series Invader Zim and Rocko's Modern Life (Invader Zim: Enter the Florpus and Rocko's Modern Life: Static Cling respectively) were released by Netflix. Other new projects planned under the team-up include a music project featuring Squidward Tentacles from the animated television series SpongeBob SquarePants, and films based on The Loud House and Rise of the Teenage Mutant Ninja Turtles. The agreement with Disney ended in 2019 due to the launch of Disney+, with its Marvel productions moving exclusively to the service in 2022.

In November 2019, Netflix announced that it had signed a long-term lease to save the Paris Theatre, the last single-screen movie theater in Manhattan. The company oversaw several renovations at the theater, including new seats and a concession stand.

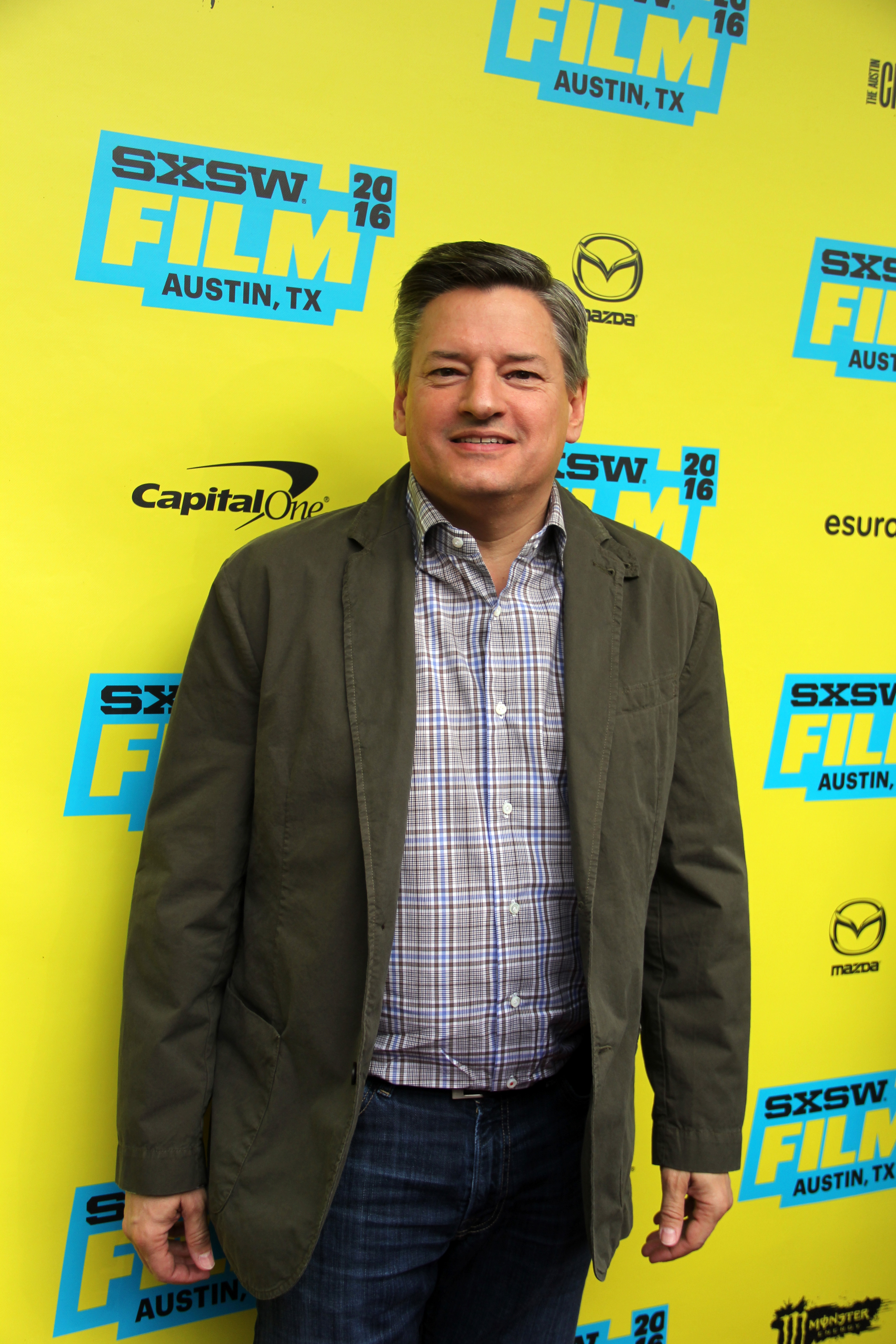
Ted Sarandos, longtime CCO and named co-CEO in 2020

In January 2020, Netflix announced a new four-film deal with Adam Sandler worth up to $275 million. On February 25, 2020, Netflix formed partnerships with six Japanese creators to produce an original Japanese anime project. This partnership includes manga creator group CLAMP, mangaka Shin Kibayashi, mangaka Yasuo Ohtagaki, novelist and film director Otsuichi, novelist Tow Ubukata, and manga creator Mari Yamazaki. On March 4, 2020, ViacomCBS announced that it will be producing two spin-off films based on SpongeBob SquarePants for Netflix. On April 7, 2020, Peter Chernin's Chernin Entertainment made a multi-year first-look deal with Netflix to make films. On May 29, 2020, Netflix announced the acquisition of Grauman's Egyptian Theatre from the American Cinematheque to use as a special events venue. In July 2020, Netflix appointed Sarandos as co-CEO. In July 2020, Netflix invested in Black Mirror creators Charlie Brooker and Annabel Jones' new production outfit Broke And Bones.

=== Expansion into gaming, end of DVDs, etc. (2021–2025) ===
In March 2021, Netflix earned the most Academy Award nominations of any studio, with 36. Netflix won seven Academy Awards, which was the most by any studio. Later that year, Netflix also won more Emmys than any other network or studio with 44 wins, tying the record for most Emmys won in a single year set by CBS in 1974. On April 8, 2021, Sony Pictures Entertainment announced an agreement for Netflix to hold the U.S. pay television window rights to its releases beginning in 2022, replacing Starz and expanding upon an existing agreement with Sony Pictures Animation. The agreement also includes a first-look deal for any future direct-to-streaming films being produced by Sony Pictures, with Netflix required to commit to a minimum number of them. On April 27, 2021, Netflix announced that it was opening its first Canadian headquarters in Toronto. The company also announced that it would open an office in Sweden as well as Rome and Istanbul to increase its original content in those regions.

In early-June, Netflix hosted a first-ever week-long virtual event called "Geeked Week", where it shared exclusive news, new trailers, cast appearances and more about upcoming genre titles like The Witcher, The Cuphead Show!, and The Sandman.

In July 2021, Netflix hired Mike Verdu, a former executive from Electronic Arts and Facebook, as vice president of game development, along with plans to add video games by 2022. Netflix announced plans to release mobile games which would be included in subscribers' plans to the service. Trial offerings were first launched for Netflix users in Poland in August 2021, offering premium mobile games based on Stranger Things including Stranger Things 3: The Game, for free to subscribers through the Netflix mobile app.

Also in September, the company announced The Queen's Ball: A Bridgerton Experience, launching in 2022 in Los Angeles, Chicago, Montreal, and Washington, D.C.

On September 20, 2021, Netflix signed a long-term lease with Aviva Investors to operate and expand the Longcross Studios in Surrey, UK. On September 21, 2021, Netflix announced that it would acquire the Roald Dahl Story Company, which manages the rights to Roald Dahl's stories and characters, for an undisclosed price and would operate it as an independent company. The company acquired Night School Studio, an independent video game developer, on September 28, 2021. Netflix officially launched mobile games on November 2, 2021, for Android users around the world. Through the app, subscribers had free access to five games, including two previously made Stranger Things titles. Netflix intends to add more games to this service over time. On November 9, the collection launched for iOS. Some games in the collection require an active internet connection to play, while others will be available offline. Netflix Kids' accounts will not have games available.

On October 13, 2021, Netflix announced the launch of the Netflix Book Club, where readers will hear about new books, films, and series adaptations and have exclusive access to each book's adaptation process. Netflix will partner with Starbucks to bring the book club to life via a social series called But Have You Read the Book?. Uzo Aduba will serve as the inaugural host of the series and announce monthly book selections set to be adapted by the streamer. Aduba will also speak with the cast, creators, and authors about the book adaptation process over a cup of coffee at Starbucks. Through October 2021, Netflix commonly reported viewership for its programming based on the number of viewers or households that watched a show in a given period (such as the first 28 days from its premiere) for at least two minutes. On the announcement of its quarterly earnings in October 2021, the company stated that it would switch its viewership metrics to measuring the number of hours that a show was watched, including rewatches, which the company said was closer to the measurements used in linear broadcast television, and thus "our members and the industry can better measure success in the streaming world." On November 16, 2021, Netflix announced the launch of "Top10 on Netflix.com", a new website with weekly global and country lists of the most popular titles on their service based on their new viewership metrics.

On November 22, 2021, Netflix announced that it would acquire Scanline VFX, the visual effects and animation company behind Cowboy Bebop and Stranger Things. On the same day, Roberto Patino signed a deal with Netflix and established his own production banner, Analog Inc., in partnership with the company. Patino's first project under the deal is a series adaptation of Image Comics' Nocterra. On December 6, 2021, Netflix and Stage 32 announced that they have teamed up the workshops at the Creating Content for the Global Marketplace program. On December 7, 2021, Netflix partnered with IllumiNative, a woman-led non-profit organization, for the Indigenous Producers Training Program.

On December 9, 2021, Netflix announced the launch of "Tudum", an official companion website that offers news, exclusive interviews, and behind-the-scenes videos for its original television shows and films. On December 13, 2021, Netflix signed a multi-year overall deal with Kalinda Vazquez. On December 16, 2021, Netflix signed a multi-year creative partnership with Spike Lee and his production company 40 Acres and a Mule Filmworks to develop film and television projects. In December 2021, former Netflix engineer Sung Mo Jun was sentenced to 2 years in prison for an insider trading scheme where he leaked subscriber numbers in advance of official releases.

In compliance with the EU Audiovisual Media Services Directive and its implementation in France, Netflix reached commitments with French broadcasting authorities and film guilds, as required by law, to invest a specific amount of its annual revenue into original French films and series. These films must be theatrically released and would not be allowed to be carried on Netflix until 15 months after their release.

The company announced plans to acquire Next Games in March 2022 for €65 million as part of Netflix's expansions into gaming. Next Games had developed the mobile title Stranger Things: Puzzle Tales as well as two The Walking Dead mobile games. Later in the month, Netflix also acquired the Texas-based mobile game developer, Boss Fight Entertainment, for an undisclosed sum.

Following the 2022 Russian invasion of Ukraine, Netflix suspended its operations and future projects in Russia. It also announced that it would not comply with a proposed directive by Roskomnadzor requiring all internet streaming services with more than 100,000 subscribers to integrate the major free-to-air channels (which are primarily state-owned). A month later, ex-Russian subscribers filed a class action lawsuit against Netflix.

At the end of Q1 2022, Netflix announced a decline in subscribers, with almost 200,000 fewer viewers than at the end of the previous year. Netflix stated that 100 million households globally were sharing passwords to their account with others, and that Canada and the United States accounted for 30 million of them. Following these announcements, Netflix's stock price fell by 35 percent. By June 2022, Netflix had laid off 450 full-time and contract employees as part of the company's plan to trim costs amid lower than expected subscriber growth. The layoffs represented approximately 2 percent of the workforce and spread across the company globally.

On April 28, 2022, the company launched its inaugural Netflix Is a Joke comedy festival, featuring more than 250 shows over 12 nights at 30-plus locations across Los Angeles, including the first-ever stand-up show at Dodger Stadium.

On July 19, 2022, Netflix announced plans to acquire Australian animation studio Animal Logic.

On September 5, 2022, Netflix opened an office in Warsaw, Poland responsible for the service's operations in 28 markets in Central and Eastern Europe.

On October 4, 2022, Netflix have signed a creative partnership with Andrea Berloff and John Gatins.

On October 11, 2022, Netflix signed up to the Broadcasters' Audience Research Board for external measurement of viewership in the UK.

On October 12, 2022, Netflix signed to build a production complex at Fort Monmouth in Eatontown, New Jersey.

On October 18, 2022, Netflix began exploring a cloud gaming offering and opened a new gaming studio in Southern California.

On January 10, 2023, Netflix announced plans to open an engineering hub in its Warsaw office. The hub is to provide Netflix's creative partners with software solutions in the production of films and series.

On April 18, 2023, Netflix announced that it would discontinue their DVD-by-mail service on September 29.

Netflix reworked its viewership metrics again in June 2023. Viewership of shows were measured during the first 91 days of availability, instead of the first 28 days, and now are based on the total viewership hours divided by the total hours of the show itself. This provided more equal considerations for shorter shows and movies compared to longer ones.

In August 2023, the company announced Netflix Stories, a collection of interactive narrative games from Netflix series and films such as Love is Blind, Money Heist and Virgin River.

Netflix discontinued its DVD mailing service as planned on September 29, 2023, in favor of its streaming business. Users of the service were able to keep the DVDs that they had received. Over its lifetime the service had sent out over 5 billion shipments.

In October 2023, Eunice Kim was promoted to Chief Product Officer and Elizabeth Stone was promoted to Chief Technology Officer. That same month, Netflix and Skydance Media entered a multi-year pact to develop and produce animated films, ending Skydance's partnership with Apple. First one under the deal was Spellbound, which premiered in 2024. Netflix would also take over distribution of preexisting Skydance Animation titles, including Ray Gunn and Swapped.

In April 2024, Netflix announced that starting in 2025, it would stop regularly reporting subscriber numbers.

In November 2024, Netflix offices in Paris and Amsterdam have been raided by the French and Dutch authorities as part of an investigation into tax fraud. The company is also under investigation for tax filings for 2019, 2020 and 2021.

The service began venturing into live sports broadcasting with the Jake Paul vs. Mike Tyson boxing match in November 2024, followed by a pair of National Football League games on Christmas Day. In January 2025, Netflix began a global broadcasting agreement with professional wrestling company WWE, under which its weekly series WWE Raw moved to Netflix worldwide, as well as rights outside of the United States to its library content, main roster live events, and all three of its main weekly programs.

In March 2026, Netflix announced its acquisition of Ben Affleck's artificial intelligence startup InterPositive, which was developing a generative AI model for use in filmmaking, trained initially on specially-filmed footage and designed to "understand visual logic and editorial consistency, while preserving cinematic rules under real-world production challenges". Affleck, Matt Damon, and Gerry Cardinale's studio Artists Equity also recently agreed to a first-look deal with Netflix.

=== Attempted acquisition of Warner Bros. (2025–2026) ===
On October 31, 2025, Netflix, Inc. was reported to be actively exploring a bid for the studios and streaming assets of Warner Bros. Discovery. According to the report, Netflix retained investment bank Moelis & Co. to evaluate a potential offer and had been granted access to Warner Bros. Discovery's financial data room as part of its preparatory due-diligence. Netflix stressed that it remains "predominantly focused on growing organically" and is not interested in owning legacy cable networks such as CNN, TBS and TNT.

Netflix had previously considered buying other companies such as 20th Century Fox, Paramount, The Walt Disney Company, and even Electronic Arts. But the price and the fear of a possible shareholder reaction prevented that.

On December 4, 2025, Netflix won the bidding war for Warner Bros. Discovery, to be followed by exclusive talks to finalize a deal. On December 5, Netflix announced a proposed agreement to acquire Warner Bros. Discovery's "Streaming and Studios" businesses for $72 billion, with a total asset value of $82.7 billion. As part of the deal, Netflix would acquire the Warner Bros. division, including its film, television and video game studios, HBO/HBO Max and their respective libraries, DC Entertainment/DC Studios and WBD's distribution, publishing and licensing divisions. The acquisition would have excluded the company's "Global Linear Networks" division (aside from Turner Classic Movies, which is aligned with the Warner Bros. film studio), which would have been divested as the separate company Discovery Global.

Paramount Skydance entered a hostile bid for the entirety of WBD at $30 per share, in an all-cash offer higher than Netflix's $27.75 per share offer for just the studios division; Paramount Skydance assessed its offer as having fewer regulatory hurdles than the Netflix offer. WBD rejected the offer due to concerns over its credibility, believing that it was inferior to Netflix's offer. On January 20, 2026, Netflix amended its own offer to an all-cash offer; WBD shareholders were expected to vote on the deal by April. On February 26, 2026, WBD agreed to a competing bid by Paramount Skydance at $31 per-share, valuing the company at approximately $111 billion. Netflix subsequently backed out, with its co-CEOs issuing a statement that its offer was "no longer financially attractive." Netflix received a $2.8 billion breakup fee from Paramount Skydance, and later announced that it would add $25 billion to its share buyback program.

==== Proposed acquisition of NBCUniversal ====
On November 12, 2026, Terry Dugan, entertainment finance co-head of law firm Moore & Van Allen, reported that Netflix would acquire NBCUniversal, He says smaller players like Lionsgate, A24 or Neon on the movie side, or Starz or AMC Global Media on the TV side, simply wouldn’t be big enough to move the needle for Netflix in terms of boosting viewing on the service.

== Corporate affairs ==
=== Historical financials and membership growth ===
View chart definition.
Worldwide VOD subscribers of Netflix

Year	Revenue in millions of US$	Net Income in millions of US$	Employees	Paid memberships in millions
2005	682	42		2.5
2006	997	49		4.0
2007	1,205	67		7.3
2008	1,365	83		9.4
2009	1,670	115.9		11.9
2010	2,163	160.9	2,180	18.3
2011	3,205	226.1	2,348	21.6
2012	3,609	17.2	2,045	30.4
2013	4,375	112.4	2,022	41.4
2014	5,505	266.8	2,450	54.5
2015	6,780	122.6	3,700	70.8
2016	8,831	186.7	4,700	89.1
2017	11,693	558.9	5,500	117.5
2018	15,794	1,211	7,100	139.3
2019	20,156	1,867	8,600	167.1
2020	24,996	2,761	9,400	203.7
2021	29,697	5,116	11,300	221.8
2022	31,615	4,492	12,800	231.7
2023	33,723	5,408	13,000	260.3
2024	39,001	8,712	14,000	301.6
2025	45,183	10,981	16,000	325

=== Board of directors ===
As of November 2026, the company's board consisted of the following directors:

- Rich Barton (co-founder of Zillow)
- Mathias Döpfner (CEO of Axel Springer SE)
- Jay Hoag (chairman of Netflix, founding partner at TCV)
- Leslie Kilgore (former Chief Marketing Officer of Netflix)
- Strive Masiyiwa (chairman and founder of Econet)
- Ann Mather (former Executive Vice President and Chief Financial Officer of Pixar)
- Ellie Mertz (Chief Financial Officer of Airbnb)
- Greg Peters (co-CEO of Netflix)
- Susan Rice (former US National Security Advisor and ambassador to the United Nations)
- Ted Sarandos (co-CEO of Netflix)
- Brad Smith (vice chairman of Microsoft)

=== Corporate culture ===
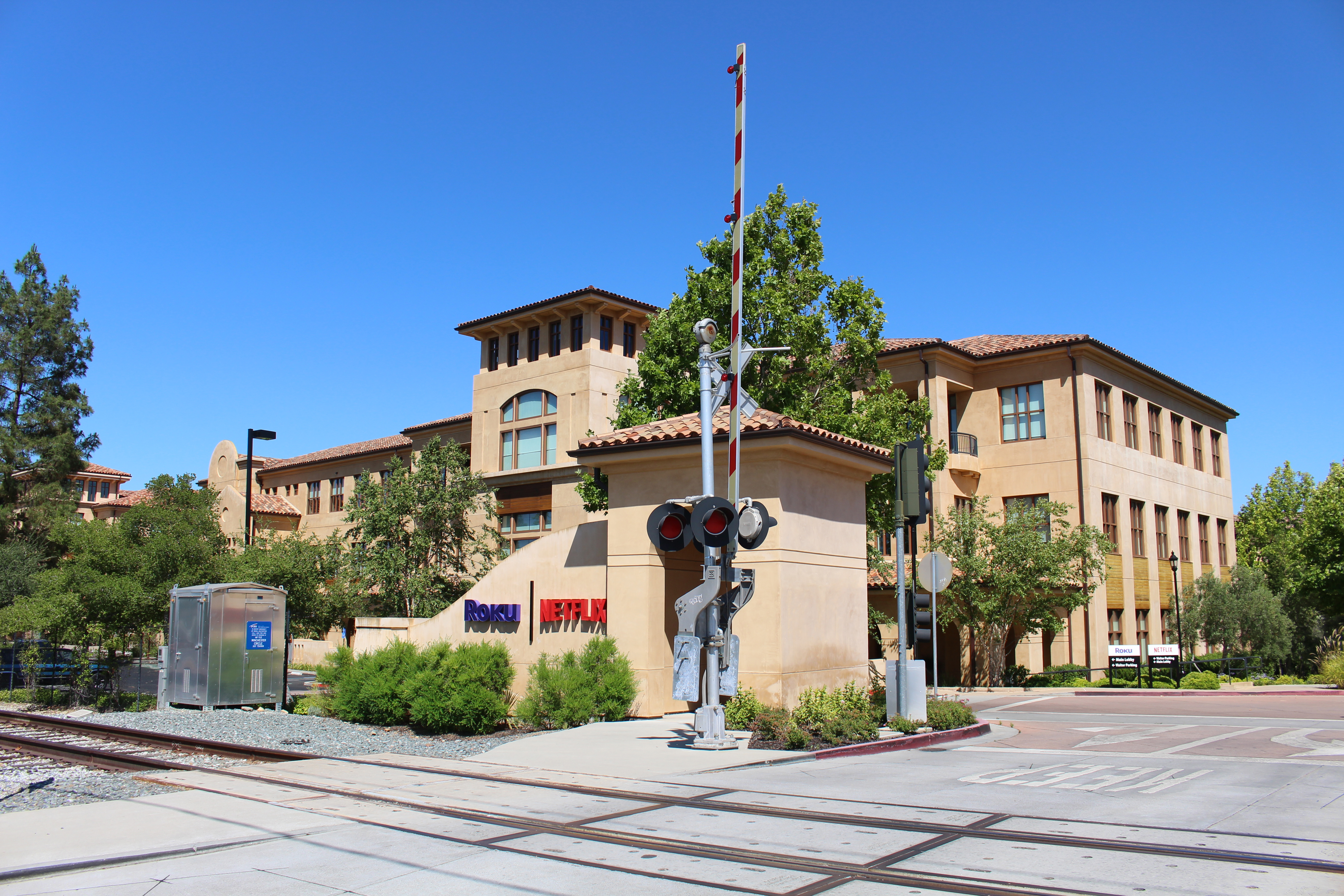
Netflix's original Los Gatos headquarters (2006–2022)

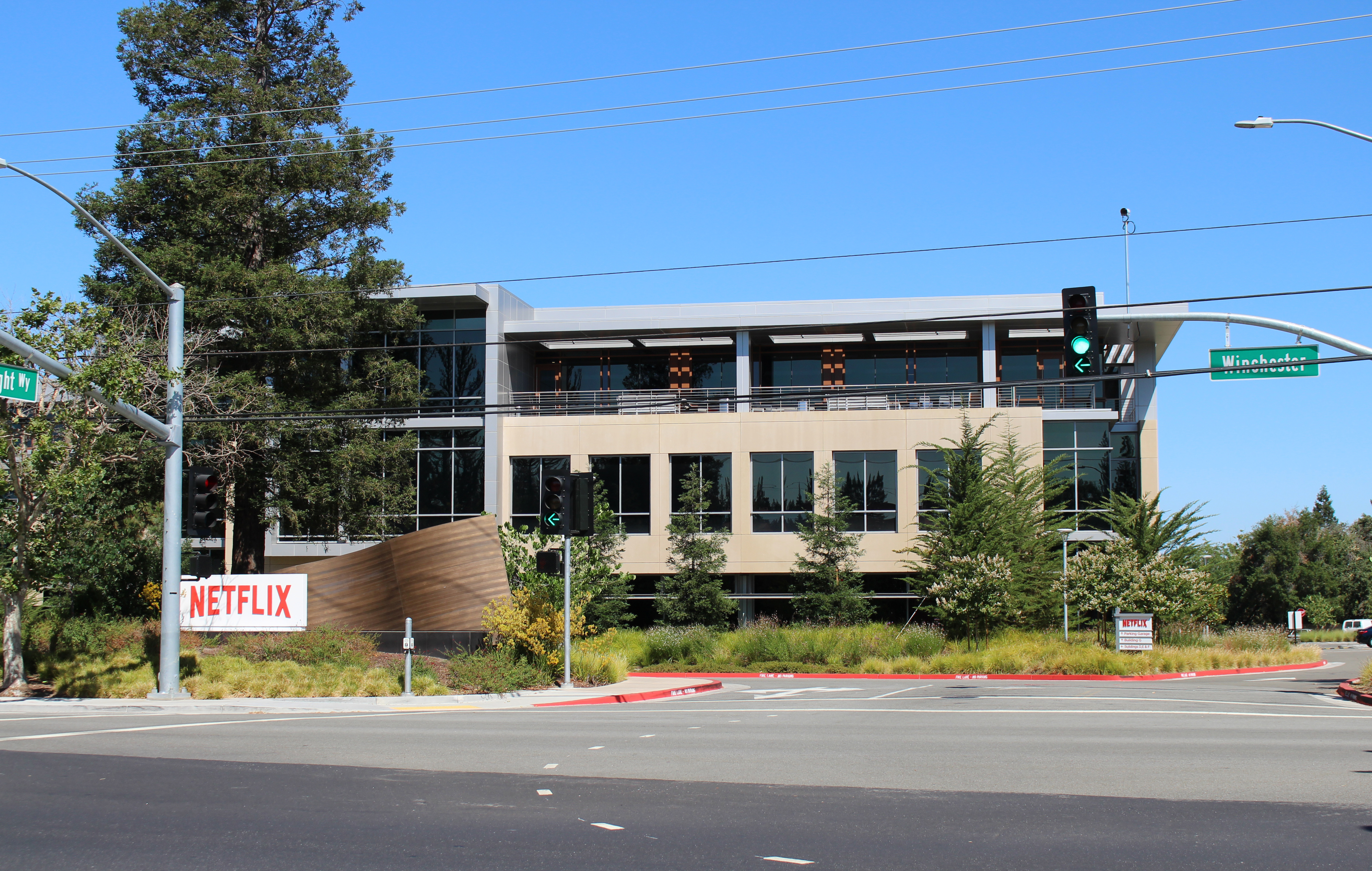
Netflix's current Los Gatos headquarters (2022–present)

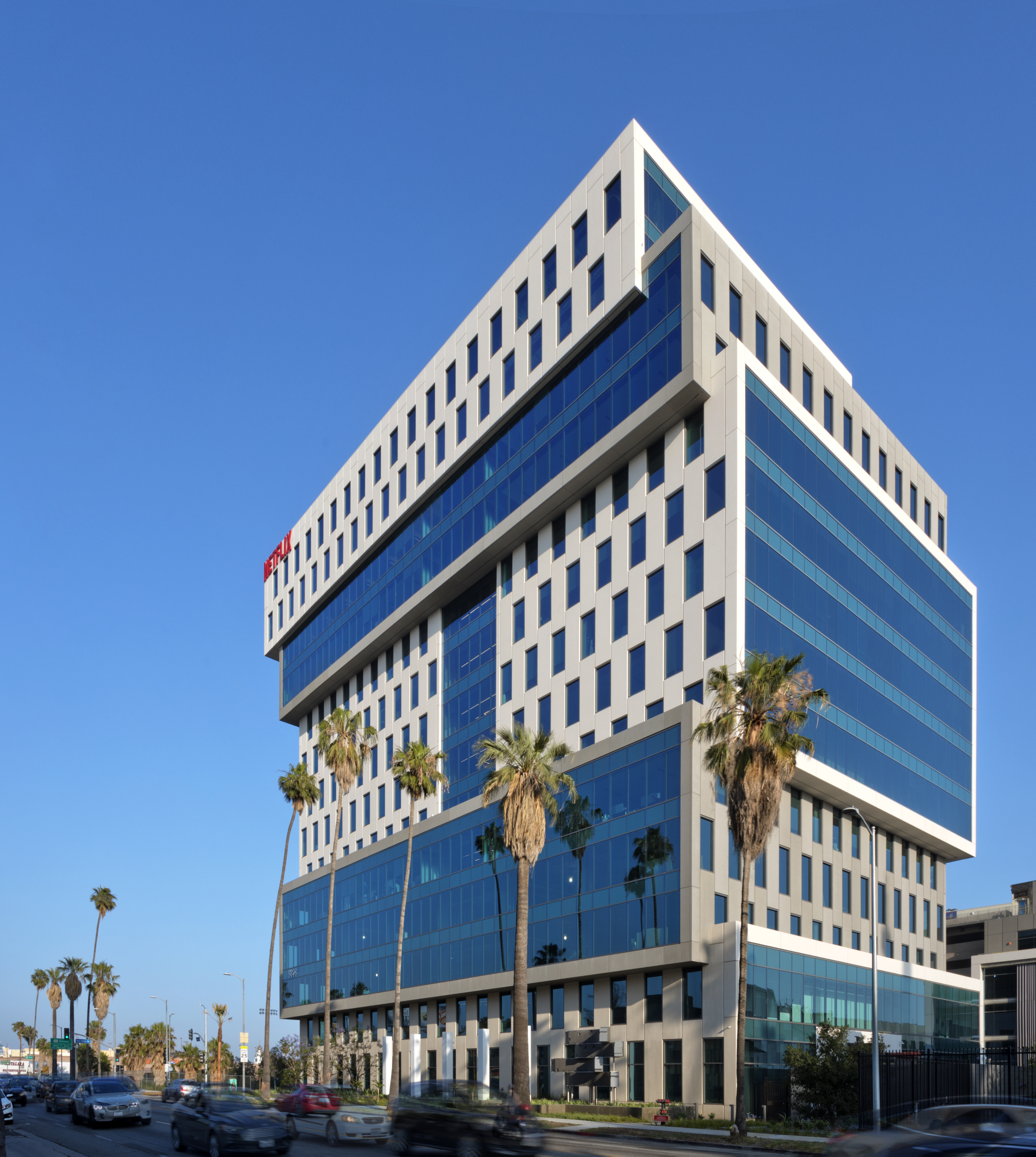
Netflix Los Angeles offices on Sunset Boulevard

Netflix grants all employees extremely broad discretion with respect to business decisions, expenses, and vacation—but in return expects consistently high performance, as enforced by what is known as the "keeper test". All supervisors are expected to constantly ask themselves if they would fight to keep an employee. If the answer is no, then the employee is dismissed. A slide from an internal presentation on Netflix's corporate culture summed up the test as: "Adequate performance gets a generous severance package." Such packages reportedly range from four months' salary in the United States to as much as six months in the Netherlands.

The company offers unlimited vacation time for salaried workers and allows employees to take any amount of their paychecks in stock options.

About the culture that results from applying such a demanding test, Hastings has said that "You gotta earn your job every year at Netflix," and, "There's no question it's a tough place ... There's no question it's not for everyone." Hastings has drawn an analogy to athletics: professional athletes lack long-term job security because an injury could end their career in any particular game, but they learn to put aside their fear of that constant risk and focus on working with great colleagues in the current moment.

=== Environmental impact ===
According to a study conducted by the International Energy Agency, streaming a 30-minute show on Netflix in 2019 released around 0.018 kg CO_{2}.

In March 2021, Netflix announced that it would work to reach net zero greenhouse gas emissions by the end of 2022, while investing in programs to preserve or restore ecosystems. The company stated that it would cut emissions from its operations and electricity use by 45 percent by 2030. Due to the COVID-19 pandemic and lack of content production, Netflix had a 14 percent drop in emissions in 2020.
