= Ingles =

American supermarket chain in the southeast region

Ingles Markets, Inc.
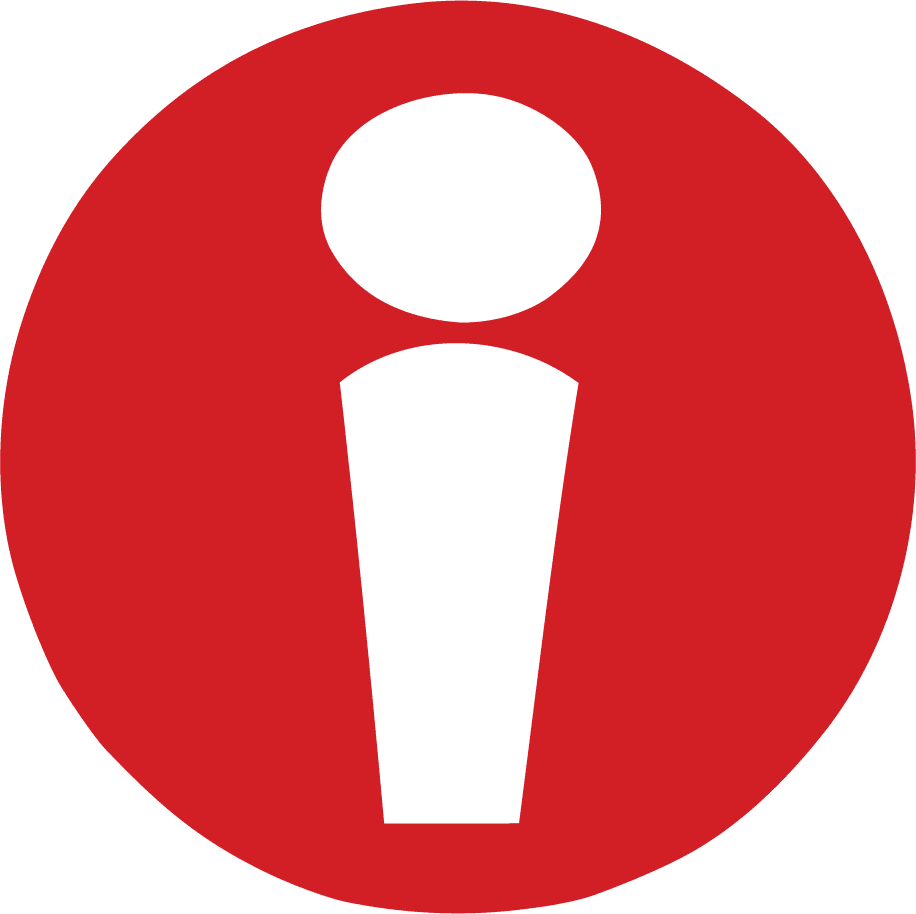

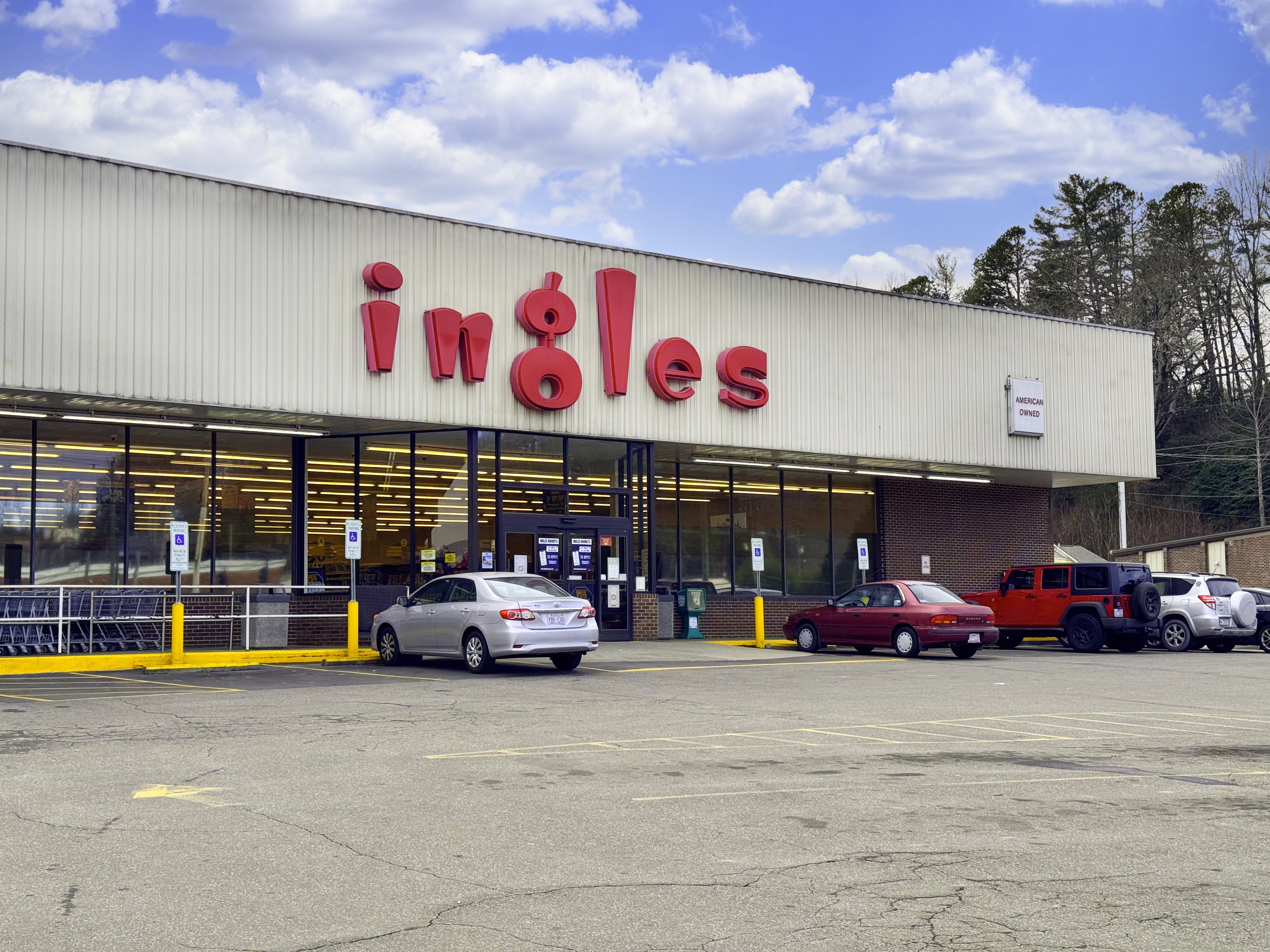
- An Ingles location in Franklin, NC
- Formerly: Ingles Corner Shop
- Type: Public
- Traded as: Nasdaq: IMKTA (Class A)
- Industry: Retail grocery
- Founded: 1963; 63 years ago, in Asheville, North Carolina, U.S.
- Founder: Robert P. Ingle
- Headquarters: Black Mountain, North Carolina, U.S.
- Number of locations: 198
- Areas served: Alabama; Georgia; North Carolina; South Carolina; Tennessee; Virginia
- Key people: Robert P. Ingle II (chairman of the board); James W. Lanning (president, CEO); Brian S. Worley (vice president); Laura Ingle Sharp (director)
- Products: Bakery, delicatessen, seafood, meat, produce, snacks, drinks, frozen foods, health & beauty, general merchandise, pharmacy
- Brands: Laura Lynn and Harvest Farms (private label)
- Revenue: ▼US$5.33 billion (2025)
- Net income: ▼US$83.6 million (2025)
- Owner: Ingle Family (50%)
- Number of employees: 26,000 (2021)
- Subsidiaries: Milkco, Inc. Sav-mor foods
- Website: ingles-markets.com

Ingles Markets, Inc. (stylized as ingles) is an American supermarket chain based in Black Mountain, North Carolina. As of September 2021, the company operates 198 supermarkets in the Appalachian region of the Southeastern United States. The company is listed on the NASDAQ under the ticker symbol IMKTA and is part of the Global Select Market tier of trading.

As an adjunct to its supermarket business, Ingles owns and operates shopping centers, gas stations and a milk processing plant.

== History ==
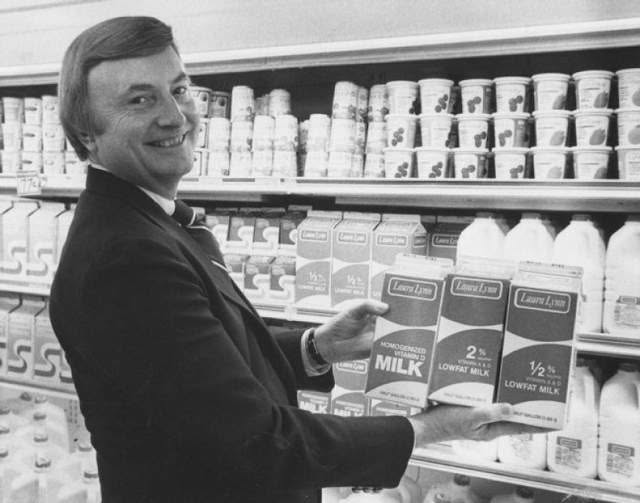
Ingles' founder, Robert P. Ingle, in 1967

The first Ingles store was opened by second-generation grocer Robert P. Ingle in 1963 and is located in Asheville, North Carolina. Ingle had worked in his uncle's store since he was five years old and was unable to convince his father to build a large store. The younger Ingle had a vision of 4000 square feet. When Elmer Ingle died in the 1950s, Robert Ingle sold the store because his mother could not run it. Seven years later at age 29, Ingle decided to build a new 10,000-square-foot store. He would have to compete with larger chains and with independent stores that used cooperative distributors.

To start his business, Ingle joined with his mother and sister, and they used all of their savings and a mortgage on the house. The first store opened on Hendersonville Road. In one year, that store was expanded, and in another year, a second location opened on Patton Avenue. Ingles was incorporated in 1965 in the state of North Carolina. In 1967, the company bought six Colonial supermarkets.

In 1982, Ingles purchased a milk processing plant from Sealtest, which it operates as Milkco Inc., a wholly owned subsidiary. Two-thirds of Milkco's business, which was later expanded beyond dairy to include products such as citrus, tea, and bottled water, is from food service distributors, grocery warehouses, and independent specialty retailers located in 17 states as of 2010. Ingles became a publicly traded company in 1987.

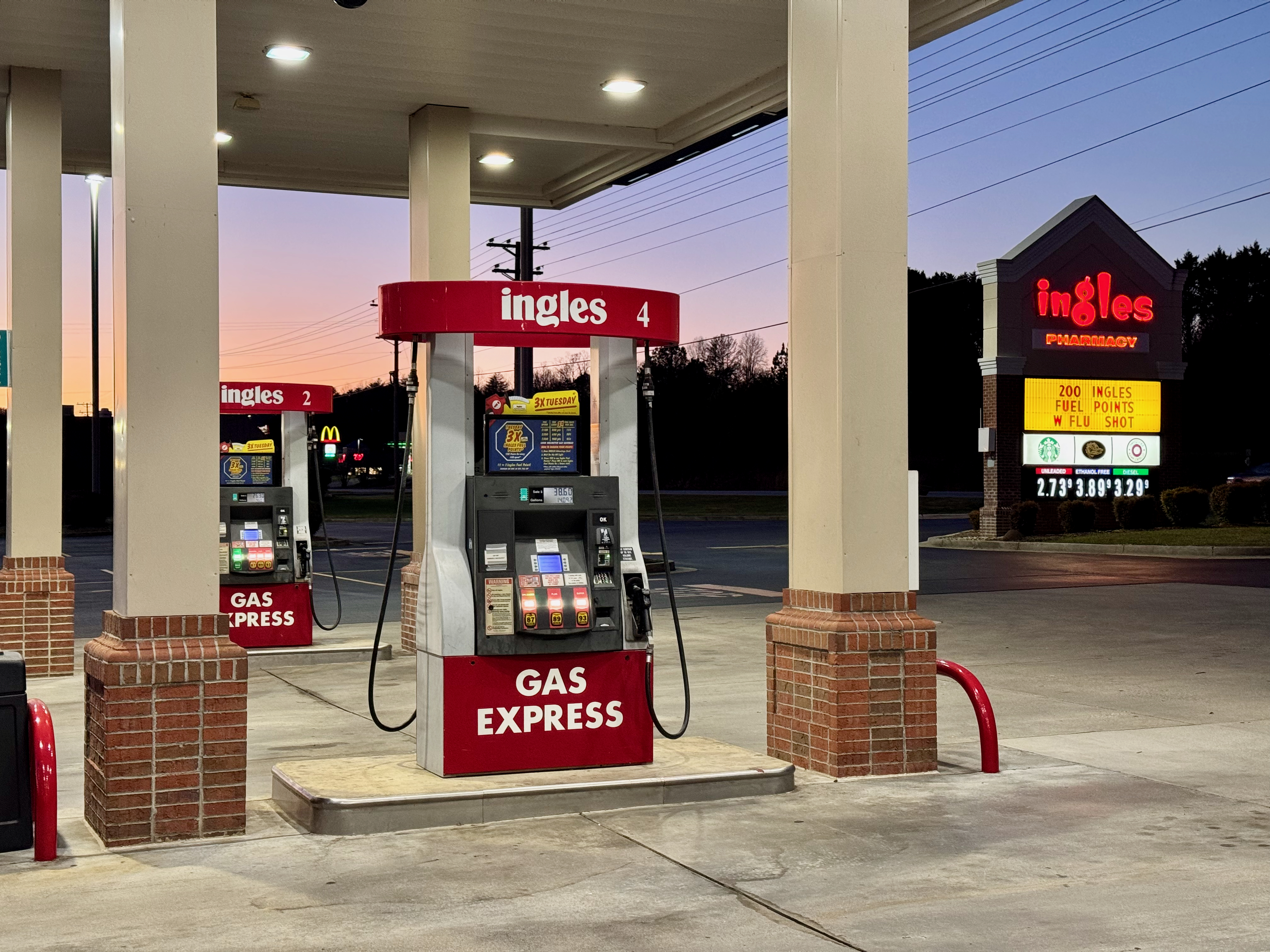
Ingles fuel pumps

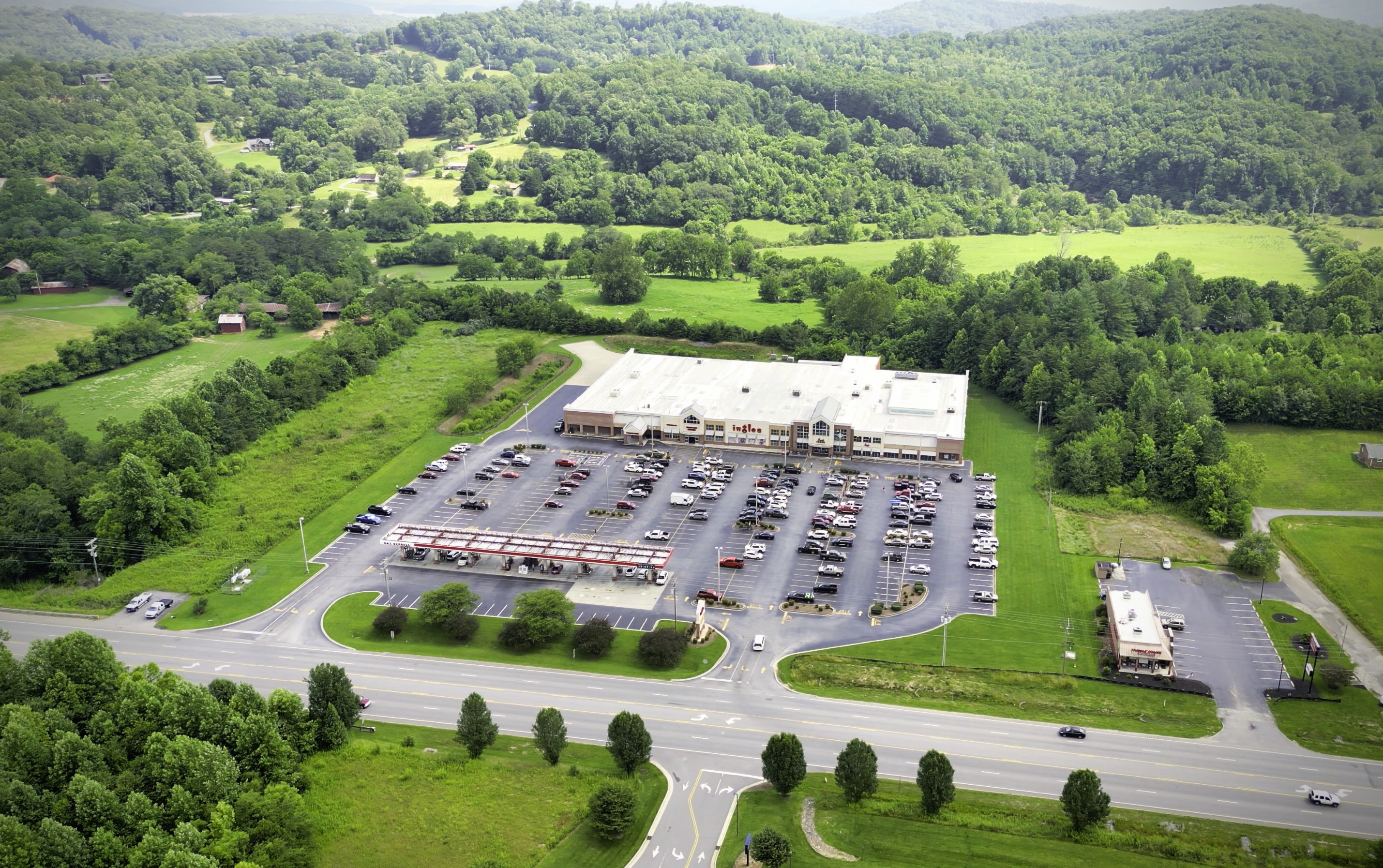
Aerial photo of an Ingles store and gas station in Hayesville, N.C.

In the summer of 1996, the chain debuted its modern large-format store design, starting with its location in Dacula, Georgia. In the 2000s, the chain started building "Ingles Gas Express" gas stations with many of its newer stores. 107 of 198 locations now have fuel stations.

In February 2005, Ingles Markets announced it would restate financial statements for fiscal years 2002 and 2003 and the first three quarters of 2004, to correct the accounting for vendor allowances and certain other items. The restatement was a significant factor in the U.S. Securities and Exchange Commission (SEC) issuing a Wells notice to the firm in January 2006, indicating that it might bring an enforcement action against it. A settlement was reached with the SEC in April 2006 that did not require payment of a monetary penalty.

Following the death of Robert Ingle on March 6, 2011, his son Robert P. Ingle II became CEO.

In December 2012 and December 2013, the company collaborated with Eblen Charities' St. Nicholas Project on what they called "Ingles Toy Store," offering "toys, games, clothes and stocking stuffers" to needy North Carolina families.

In July 2021, Ingles collaborated with Creating A Family.

In September 2024, Ingles was severely impaired by flooding from Hurricane Helene. The company's distribution center in Swannanoa was surrounded by water from the adjacent Swannanoa River. That and the closure of major highways throughout western North Carolina led to shortages on store shelves. The chain's credit card transactions are handled at its Asheville-area headquarters, which was flooded, causing all stores in the chain to accept only cash and check payments for days. Some stores without power and water temporarily closed, hampering rural communities with only one supermarket at a time when clean water and food was sorely needed. Lines formed outside other stores as staff allowed, in some cases, only five shoppers inside at a time. The storm caused $4.5 million in damage to the company's equipment and property. An additional $30.4 million worth of Ingles inventory was damaged or destroyed.

== Operations ==
Ingles owns 163 of its 198 supermarkets either as free-standing locations or in shopping centers where it is the anchor tenant. The remaining 35 locations are leased from various unaffiliated third parties. The company also owns 23 undeveloped sites which are suitable for a free-standing store or shopping center development. The company owns numerous outparcels and other acreage located adjacent to the shopping centers and supermarkets it owns. Real estate owned by the company is generally located in the same geographic regions as its supermarkets. Ingles also operates 111 pharmacies and 107 gas stations at select retail locations. As of 2023, Ingles had a workforce of approximately 25,000 associates.

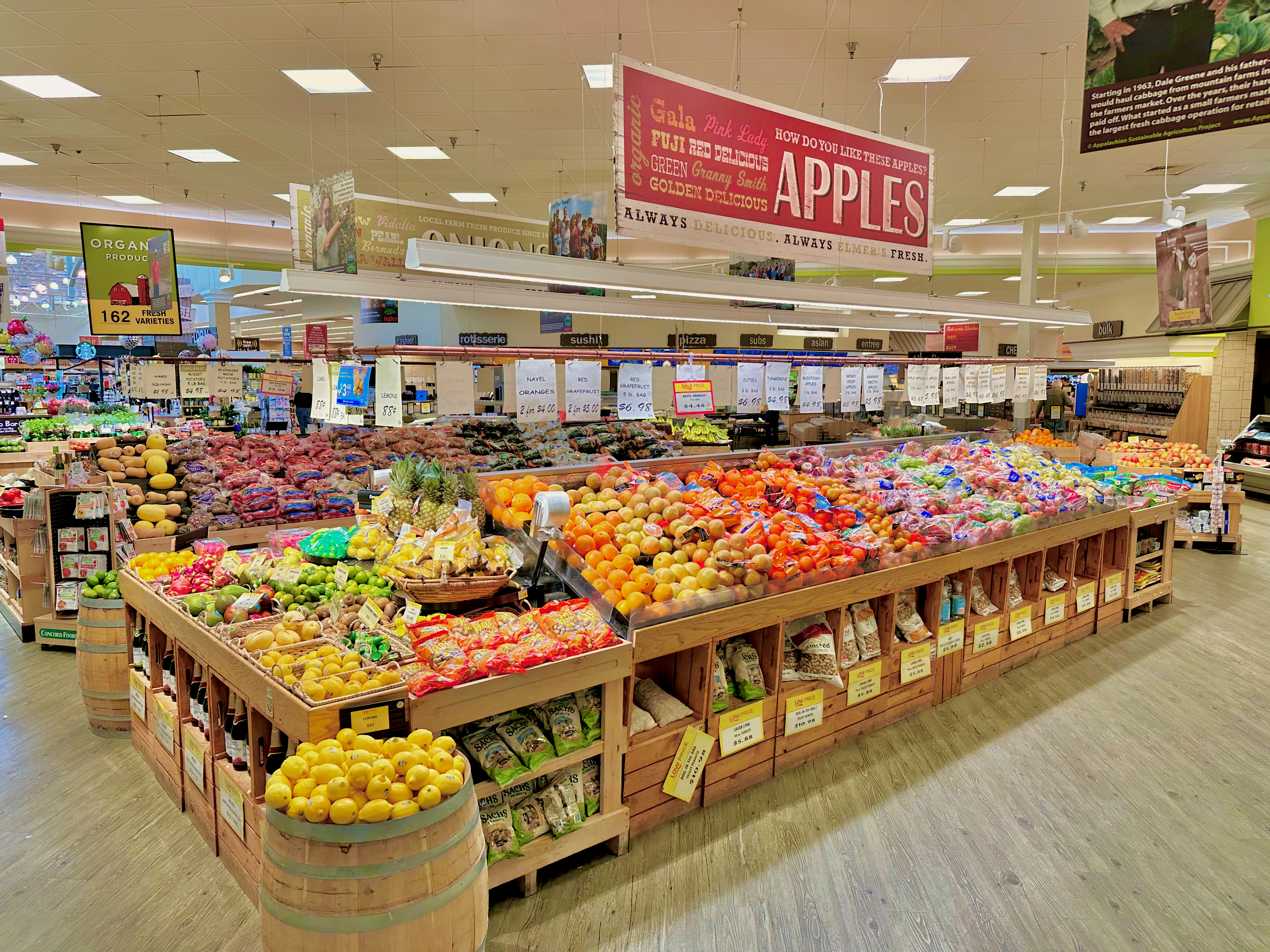
The produce area inside Ingles Store #25 in Murphy, N.C.

Ingles also owns and operates nine supermarkets under the name “Sav-Mor” with the other 189 locations being Ingles Markets. The Sav-Mor store concept accommodates smaller shopping areas and carries dry groceries, dairy, fresh meat and produce.

Most of Ingles' stores are located within 280 miles (450 km) of its warehouse and distribution facilities, near Asheville, North Carolina. The company operates 1.65 million square feet of warehouse and distribution facilities. These facilities supply the company’s supermarkets with approximately 62% of the goods the company sells. The remaining 38% is purchased from third parties and is generally delivered directly to the stores. The proximity of the company’s purchasing and distribution operations to its stores facilitates the distribution of perishable and non-perishable items.

The company owns a 1,649,000 square foot facility, which is strategically located between Interstate 40 and Highway 70 near Asheville, North Carolina, as well as the 119 acres of land on which it is situated. The facility includes the company’s headquarters and its warehouse and distribution facility. The property also includes truck servicing and fuel storage facilities. The company also owns a 139,000 square foot warehouse on 21 acres of land approximately one mile from its main warehouse and distribution facility. Goods from the warehouse and distribution facilities and the milk processing and packaging plant are distributed to the company’s stores by a fleet of 193 tractors and 751 trailers that the company owns, operates and maintains.

== Locations ==
As of 2025, Ingles operates 194 stores in six southeastern states:

- Alabama: 1
- Georgia: 64
- North Carolina: 72
- South Carolina: 35
- Tennessee: 21
- Virginia: 1

Nine of these stores are operated under the Sav-Mor Foods brand, with locations in North Carolina, South Carolina and Tennessee.

== Private label brands ==
Ingles sells products with the Laura Lynn brand, named for Ingle's daughter Laura Lynn, now Laura Ingle Sharp. She worked in advertising for the chain starting in the 1970s and has been a member of the board of directors since 1997. The chain sells natural and organic products under the Harvest Farms label. A few other products are sold with the Ingles Best label. The brand of generic pharmacy products sold, Quality Choice, is not a brand exclusive to Ingles Markets.

== Competition ==
Local and regional competitors include Food City, Food Lion, Harris Teeter, Dollar General, Harveys, Target, Aldi, Lidl, Walmart, Kroger, Lowes Foods, Publix, and United Grocery Outlet.
