= Freedom and Responsibility =

Freedom and Responsibility is an independent UK civil liberties research group formed on 25 March 2020, in the wake of the UK COVID-19 response, utilising legal, medical, journalistic and campaign expertise.

Its first report raises serious concerns with the legality of the UK Government measures, including multiple cases of criminality.

Freedom and Responsibility may also refer to:

- a saying coined by historian Carl L. Becker
- an influential presentation about the corporate culture of Netflix, created by Reed Hastings and Patty McCord
