= Grocery Outlet =

American retail company

Grocery Outlet Holding Corp.

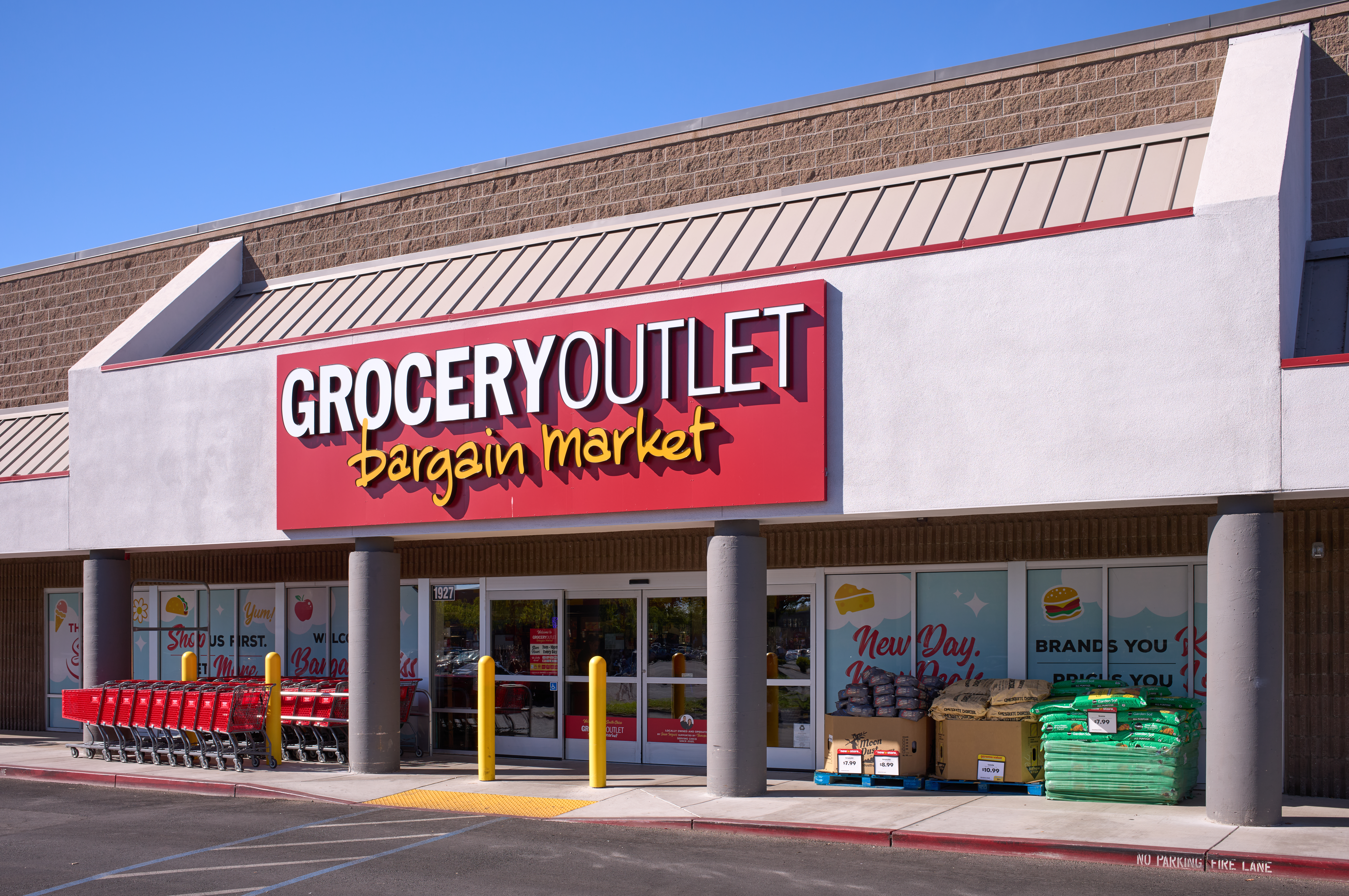
- Trade name: Grocery Outlet Bargain Market
- Formerly: Cannery Sales (1946–1970); Canned Foods (1970–1987)
- Type: Public
- Traded as: Nasdaq: GO; S&P 600 component
- Industry: Discount retail / Grocery
- Founded: June 11, 1946; 80 years ago, in San Francisco, California, U.S.
- Founder: James Read
- Headquarters: Emeryville, California, U.S.
- Number of locations: 480 (May 2024)
- Key people: Jason Potter (CEO)
- Products: Bakery, dairy, deli meats, frozen foods, general grocery, meat, produce, snacks, beer & wine
- Services: Discount retail Supermarket
- Revenue: US$4.689 billion (2025)
- Net income: ▼ −US$225 million (2025)
- Owner: Read family (55% via Read Enterprises, Inc.)
- Number of employees: 949 (2024)
- Parent: Berkshire Partners (2009–2014); Hellman & Friedman LLC (2014–2019)
- Subsidiaries: United Grocery Outlet
- Website: groceryoutlet.com

Grocery Outlet Holding Corp. is an American discount closeout retailer consisting exclusively of supermarket locations that offer discounted, overstocked, and closeout products from name-brand and private-label suppliers. The company has stores in California, Oregon, Washington, Idaho, Nevada, Maryland, Pennsylvania, New Jersey, Ohio, and Delaware.

The vast majority of Grocery Outlet's stores are independently operated by local married couples. Each store has flexibility in its product offerings to serve local tastes and demand. The Read family founded the company in 1946. The formal name is Grocery Outlet Bargain Market.

== History ==
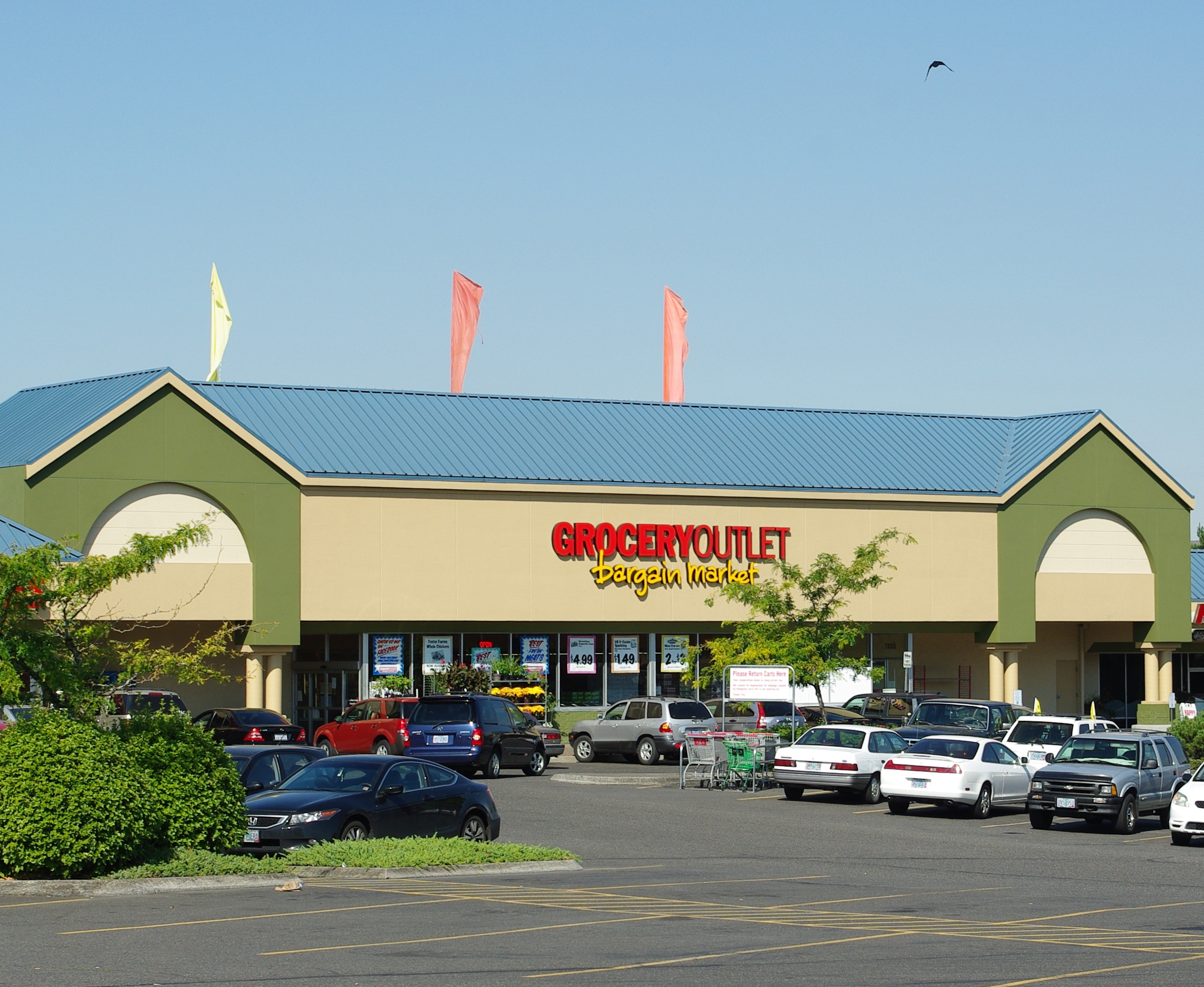
A location in Tanasbourne, Oregon

James Read founded the company on June 11, 1946, in San Francisco, California. He bought government surplus food products and sold them in previously vacant stores throughout San Francisco. He named his new company Cannery Sales. In 1970, Cannery Sales acquired Globe of California and renamed it Canned Foods Warehouse. Canned Foods Warehouse changed to selling closeout, factory second, and discounted products. In 1971 Canned Foods Warehouse signed its first agreement with a supplier, Del Monte Foods. It later signed agreements with companies such as ConAgra, the Quaker Oats Company, and Revlon. Canned Foods Warehouse opened its first independent store in Redmond, Oregon, in 1973.

Following founder James Read's death in 1982, his sons Steven and Peter took over company management. In 1987, the company was renamed Grocery Outlet. Grocery Outlet's 100th store opened in 1995.

In 2001, Grocery Outlet acquired all remaining liquidated inventories of Webvan following the online grocery delivery service's bankruptcy. During the same year, Grocery Outlet acquired online retailer Wine.com's remaining inventory following that retailer's bankruptcy. In 2002, the company changed its corporate name to Grocery Outlet, Inc.

Grocery Outlet purchased 16 Yes!Less grocery stores in Texas and another in Shreveport, Louisiana, from Dallas, Texas-based Fleming Cos. in January 2003. All 17 stores were closed by May 2004.

The company promoted MacGregor Read and Eric Lindberg to co-CEO in 2006. Prior to their appointment, Read was vice president of real estate and Lindberg vice president of purchasing for the company. They took over for Steven Read, who became executive chairman of Grocery Outlet. MacGregor Read is the son of Steven Read and Lindberg the son-in-law of Grocery Outlet Chairman Peter Read. MacGregor Read is the third generation of the Read family to serve as CEO of Grocery Outlet.

In 2007, the United States Court of Appeals for the Ninth Circuit awarded Albertsons an injunction against Grocery Outlet over its use of the Lucky brand name in a Rocklin, California, store. In 2009, the company added "Bargain Market" to its store branding. In 2011, Grocery Outlet acquired the Pennsylvania-based chain Amelia's Grocery Outlet.

In 2009, Berkshire Partners became an investor in Grocery Outlet. In 2014, private equity fund Hellman & Friedman LLC agreed to partner with senior management and acquire Grocery Outlet from principal owner Berkshire Partners LLC.

In December 2018, the Board of Directors appointed Eric Lindberg to Chief Executive Officer and MacGregor Read to Vice Chairman.

In June 2019, Grocery Outlet went public and shares of Grocery Outlet's common stock began trading on Nasdaq Global Select Market on June 20, 2019, under the symbol "GO".

In January 2023, RJ Sheedy, who already held the title of president, also assumed the role of CEO.

On March 4, 2026, Grocery Outlet announced the closure of 36 locations, 24 of which are in the eastern United States. Grocery Outlet president and CEO Jason Potter said that the retailer's fourth quarter results were "unacceptable" and that there is "more work to do than we expected".

== Products ==
Inventory comes primarily from overstocks and closeouts of name-brand groceries, as well as private-label groceries. Grocery Outlet buys mostly closeout or seasonal merchandise, so particular brand names change often. The company's stores also carry food staples such as fresh meat, dairy and bread. All products sold by Grocery Outlet are purchased directly from manufacturers, never from other retail stores. One of the most popular sections in Grocery Outlet is labeled NOSH (natural, organic, specialty and healthy). Mainly because of this section, Grocery Outlet has attracted followers who want to buy ethical items (often vegan and/or plant-based) on a budget.
