= Greg Peters (businessman) =

American businessman, co-CEO of Netflix

Greg Peters is an American businessman. He is co-chief executive officer of Netflix.

== Early life and education ==
Peters was born in Colorado in November 1970. He is the grandson of William Peters, a journalist and civil rights activist, and the nephew of Gretchen Peters, a singer and songwriter. His mother was one of the first women to be employed by IBM as an analyst.

Peters attended Wichita College in Kansas and Yale University, where he earned a BS degree in physics and astronomy and where he was a member of Skull and Bones. He was introduced to computer programming by his mother, who taught him to code on an Apple II that she and his father had bought for him.

== Career ==
After college, Peters built satellites for the U.S. Air Force before taking up an engineering position at Wine.com. He was also a senior vice president at Macrovision Solutions Corp (renamed to Rovi Corporation).

In 2008, Peters joined Netflix as the company's international development officer, responsible for global partnerships with consumer electronics companies, internet service providers, and multi-channel video programming distributors.

In July 2017, Peters became the chief product officer of Netflix. During his time in that role, Netflix introduced smart downloads, mobile games, ads, and new crackdowns on password sharing. According to Bloomberg News, Netflix co-founder Reed Hastings put Peters in charge of these areas of the company and praised Peters for making "great decisions". Later, in 2020, he also became the chief operating officer of Netflix.

In January 2023, Peters became the co-chief executive officer of Netflix along with Ted Sarandos, after Hastings stepped down and became executive chairman.

== Personal life ==
Peters is married to Kimi, and has two children. He resides in San Francisco.
