= Ted Sarandos =

American business executive (born 1964)

Ted Sarandos CBE
- Sarandos in 2026
- Born: July 30, 1964 (age 62); Long Branch, New Jersey, U.S.
- Occupation: Media executive
- Years active: 1988-present
- Title: Co-chief executive officer of Netflix
- Board member of: Spotify; Peabody Awards; American Film Institute
- Spouses: Michelle Sarandos (divorced); Nicole Avant (m. 2009)
- Children: 2

Theodore Anthony Sarandos Jr., CBE (born July 30, 1964) is an American media executive who has been the co-chief executive officer (co-CEO) of Netflix since 2020.

== Early life and education ==
Sarandos was born on July 30, 1964, in Long Branch, New Jersey. He grew up in Phoenix, Arizona, with his parents and four siblings. His father, Theodore Sarandos Sr., was an electrician, and his mother was a homemaker. His grandfather, Alex Karyotakis, migrated to the United States from the Greek island of Samos and changed his name to Sarandos.

As a child, he spent hours watching television shows like Happy Days, I Love Lucy, The Jack Benny Program, and The Andy Griffith Show. He stated that his family did not travel much, "so the way to see the world was through books and movies and television." In his teens, he developed a knowledge of film and TV, and strong instincts for what people liked while working at a video store. While writing for his high school newspaper, Sarandos met and interviewed the actor Ed Asner, who was in Phoenix for a local Screen Actors Guild meeting. Asner, then in the height of his Lou Grant period, introduced Sarandos to others in the entertainment industry for further interviews and connected his interests in entertainment, politics, and journalism.

Sarandos was educated at Alhambra High School in Phoenix and attended Glendale Community College in Glendale, Arizona, for two years before dropping out. In an interview with The Sunday Times, he said, "I had this kind of epiphany in junior college that I was not a very good writer, so I was probably not going to be a professional journalist. I didn’t really have a plan B." He then prioritized working at the video store, changing from part-time to full-time.

== Career ==
=== Early career (1983–2000) ===
He was promoted to store manager of the Cassettes West chain in 1983 and managed retail video stores until 1988. In 1988, Sarandos became Western Regional Director of Sales and Operations for one of the largest video distributors in the United States, East Texas Distributors (ETD). Until March 2000, Sarandos was Vice President of Product and Merchandising for the almost 500 store chain, Video City/West Coast Video. While at West Coast Video, he was responsible for negotiating revenue deals to migrate the company from the VHS format into the DVD format.

=== Netflix (1999–present) ===
In 1999, an article came out regarding Sarandos' success, which caught the attention of Netflix CEO Reed Hastings. "I did a deal with Warner Bros. and with Sony to do revenue sharing on DVD, which was an unheard-of thing at the time," Sarandos said. "Reed saw the article and said, 'Oh, this is what we need.'" After meeting with Hastings in 1999, Sarandos joined Netflix in 2000. He serves as its co-chief executive officer. Before that, he was the company's chief content officer, overseeing Netflix's original programming and entertainment efforts.

Sarandos was responsible for initiating the first round of original programming at Netflix, starting with Lilyhammer, and then continuing with the breakout David Fincher series starring Kevin Spacey, House of Cards. Beginning with House of Cards, which was bought for $100 million in a March 2011 deal, Sarandos created Netflix's model of purchasing multiple seasons of shows without pilot orders. Sarandos sees the focus as being on subscriber growth as a reflection of revenue health over ratings. This has since changed, when Netflix decided to initiate an Ad-Supported model, which allows users to pay a lower price but have to view advertisements on their account.

Sarandos was also instrumental in Netflix going the route of dropping all of a season's episodes at once, calling it "a super-practical decision". He explained that Netflix had been seeing its users' viewing habits, saying people watched a varied number of episodes but that "nobody watched one." This all-at-once choice made front-page news in The New York Times, with an article titled, "New Way to Deliver a Drama: All 13 Episodes in One Sitting." Following the successful release of House of Cards, Sarandos expanded upon the way Netflix would release shows, saying, "It was not meant to be the template. It was just, Let’s see how people watch it." During a session at the 2015 Aspen Ideas Festival, Sarandos referred to the new program schedule as “The New Golden Age of Television.”

Sarandos uses algorithms at Netflix to predict what programs viewers will want to watch prior to producing them. His personal algorithm focuses on 30% judgement (as a highest priority), with 70% focused on a base of data. He also said that the focus is on the audience, and that there is no programming grid – or appointment linear-based television – that is typically used by traditional TV networks. Barometers of success are whether the audience completes watching the show, the timeframe within which they finish watching a series, and whether there is attention from critics and fans. Sarandos said that the preference is for a show to run for multiple seasons and build a fan base. Sarandos believes the model allows the viewer to be in control and to watch only the content they enjoy. He said Netflix aggregates audiences over a very long period of time, where Netflix can tell if a show will be successful by using a regression model.

Sarandos has been outspoken about discarding or not holding important traditional network models. He describes the broadcast TV model as archaic. Sarandos said he sees the new model as a way to prioritize the needs and desires of the consumer. International reach and long tail, niche appeal is also an important part of the business model. The spend is typically a large upfront payment, with no back-end fees to talent and creators, especially of original Netflix-owned content. Sarandos said he sees the Netflix brand as being based on personalization, that it was a deliberate choice on the part of Netflix to focus on providing diverse content that would appeal to the tastes of a broad base of viewers – one that would not be focused on a marquee show that Netflix would be known for, but quality shows that would appeal to different audiences.

Sarandos has said that he sees Netflix as a digital product, where the balance between distributing physical bits of content versus streaming digital content would be cheaper as both broadband and Netflix grew. The shift away from the DVD business came from this evaluation of a new model focused on streaming and original programming. During the 2016 Television Critics Association presentation, Sarandos said he expects the amount Netflix spends on original programming to rise considerably.

Co-CEO of Netflix

In 2020, Netflix announced Sarandos as its co-chief executive officer and member of the company's board of directors. On January 19, 2023, Hastings stepped down as co-CEO to become Executive Chairman. Greg Peters was named co-CEO alongside Sarandos.

In 2021, Netflix faced controversy after the release of comedian Dave Chappelle's stand-up special, The Closer, which contained transphobic jokes that offended both LGBTQ activists and Netflix employees. An internal memo from Sarandos argued the special did not incite hate or violence. Days later, he sent a second email, saying: “We have a strong belief that content on screen doesn’t directly translate to real-world harm.” In response, the trans employee resource group (ERG) at Netflix planned a company-wide walkout. Sarandos later admitted to Deadline that he "screwed up the internal communication" and acknowledged that some employees were "hurting very badly from the decision made." Variety called the entire incident a "rare blunder for Sarandos and Netflix".

In February 2026, Sarandos spoke before the United States Senate during a hearing about Netflix's proposed acquisition of Warner Bros. Discovery and HBO. He went before the Judiciary subcommittee on Antitrust, Competition Policy, and Consumer Rights, where Republicans critiqued Netflix's "overwhelming woke" programming, calling the streamer politically biased. Sarandos responded, saying, "Netflix has no political agenda of any kind," and that Netflix has "a great deal of programming on Netflix for all, left, right and center". Sarandos also visited the White House regarding both Netflix's proposal to acquire Warner Bros. and President Donald Trump’s demand that the company fire board member Susan Rice, a former adviser for the Biden administration. Sarandos had met privately with Trump in November. However, Sarandos never met with Trump or any White House officials during the February trip, according to Axios. The meeting was reportedly "canceled because of a last-minute scheduling conflict". Some speculated that this led Netflix to drop out of the bidding war for Warner Bros., but Sarandos told Bloomberg that Netflix has already decided not to up its bid.

== Board and advisory work ==
Sarandos is a member of several boards, including: Academy Museum of Motion Pictures, Board of Trustees, Exploring The Arts, Board of Trustees, American Cinematheque, Board member, American Film Institute, Board of Trustees, Peabody Awards, Board of Directors, Spotify, Board of Directors, and Paley Center for Media - Board of Trustees. He has also served on the Film Advisory Board for the Tribeca Festival and the Los Angeles Film Festival.

== Personal life ==
Sarandos married Michelle Sarandos, his first wife, with whom he had two children: film producer Sarah Sarandos and film editor Anthony Sarandos. In 2009, Sarandos married former United States Ambassador to the Bahamas (2009–2011) Nicole Avant, the daughter of former Motown chairman Clarence Avant. The couple live in the Hancock Park neighborhood of Los Angeles, after previously living in Avant's home town of Beverly Hills, California. In 2013, the couple purchased a beach house formerly owned by David Spade in Malibu, California. Sarandos is Catholic.

Sarandos and his wife held a fundraiser for President Barack Obama's 2012 campaign in Southern California in 2009, and raised over $700,000 for the Democratic candidate.

== Honors and awards ==
- 2008: Aspen Institute – Henry Crown Fellow
- 2013: Time – Time 100
- 2014: Simon Wiesenthal Center – Humanitarian Award
- 2015: International Documentary Association – Pioneer Award
- 2015: International Cinematographers Guild (ICG) Publicists Awards – Television Showman of the Year Award
- 2015: National Association of Television Program Executives – Brandon Tartikoff Legacy Award
- 2017: SAG-AFTRA – Patron of the Artists Award
- The Harvard Lampoon – Honorary Member
- 2020: Producers Guild of America – Milestone Award
- 2022: Cannes Lions International Festival of Creativity – Entertainment Person of the Year
- 2024: Honorary Commander of the Order of the British Empire
