= United Grocery Outlet =

Regional discount supermarket chain

- Company type: Subsidiary
- Industry: Retail (Grocery)
- Founded: 1974; 52 years ago
- Headquarters: Athens, Tennessee, United States
- Number of locations: 41
- Key people: Gary Buchanan, CEO
- Products: Bakery, dairy, deli, frozen foods, general grocery, meat, produce, snacks
- Parent: Grocery Outlet Holding; (2024–present)
- Website: myugo.com

Older logo

United Grocery Outlet, also branded as Bargain Barn Inc. and GO: Grocery Outlet, is a regional discount supermarket chain based in Athens, Tennessee. In addition to its 24 locations in Tennessee, it has stores in Western North Carolina (9), Georgia (4), Kentucky (1), Virginia (1) and Alabama (1).

Considered the largest closeout grocer in the Southeastern US, the company was acquired in 2024 by Grocery Outlet Holding.
