= Wine.com =

Online wine retailer

- Industry: Online wine retail
- Founded: San Francisco, California, 1998
- Headquarters: San Francisco, California
- Website: wine.com

Wine.com is an American wine online retailer. Wine.com sells over 2 million bottles per year, with a stock of more than 17,000 different bottles of wine, in the United States.

== History ==
In 1995, David Harmon founded Wine.com as an information site. Separately Virtual Vineyards was founded in 1994 in Los Altos, California, by Robert Olson with co-founders Peter Granoff, a master sommelier, and Harry Max, an information architect. Virtual Vineyards sold its first bottle of wine online on January 24, 1995, and began full operations about two weeks later. As a competitor to Virtual Vineyards, Mike Osborn founded eVineyard in Portland, Oregon, in 1998. In 1999, Harmon sold the information site wine.com to Virtual Vineyards for over US$10,000,000. Virtual Vineyards and Wineshopper.com, another ecommerce wine business, merged in 2000. Virtual Vineyards went bankrupt, and in the spring of 2001, eVineyard purchased its assets, rebranding the combined businesses as Wine.com, which then moved its corporate offices to San Francisco. In 2006, Rich Bergsund joined Wine.com as CEO, seeing the company through a financial turnaround. According to Internet Retailer, the company grew to become the biggest online wine retailer in the United States. Wine.com is majority-owned by Baker Capital, a New York–based private equity firm.
