= Patty McCord =

American business executive, and author

Patty McCord is a human resources (HR) consultant and executive. She was the chief talent officer at Netflix. She joined Netflix in 1998.

McCord's path to Netflix started with her working with Reed Hastings at Pure Software. He called her after that company was sold and asked her to join another startup, that startup was called Netflix.

She was made redundant herself in 2012 as they transitioned away from a mail order DVD service to a streaming service. After receiving her own redundancy she wrote a book about these cultural ideas, Powerful: Building a Culture of Freedom and Responsibility, which was published in 2018. The book has achieved (as of this edit) a rank in the top 100 business books on Amazon.

== Awards and recognition ==
Inc Magazine referenced her book in "8 Books Every Entrepreneur Should Read in 2019".

Business Insider referenced her book in "The 10 best business and leadership books of 2018".

McCord was a featured TED speaker in June 2015 where she shared her experiences in HR in Silicon Valley.
