= Cliff Click =

American computer scientist and software engineer

- Occupations: Computer scientist, entrepreneur
- Known for: HotSpot Server Compiler; Azul Systems; H2O.ai
- Title: CTO at CRATUS Technology (since February 2019)

Academic background
- Education: Texas A&M University (BS, MS); Rice University (PhD)
- Doctoral advisor: Keith D. Cooper
- Website: hachyderm.io/@cliffc

Clifford Noel "Cliff" Click Jr. is an American computer scientist and software engineer known for his work on compiler design and Java virtual machine (JVM) performance. He was the primary architect of the HotSpot Server Compiler at Sun Microsystems and co-founded several technology companies, including Azul Systems and H2O.ai.

== Education ==
Click earned his Bachelor of Science in electrical and electronics engineering from Texas A&M University in 1988, followed by a Master of Science in computer science in 1992. Click earned his PhD in computer science from Rice University under the supervision of Keith D. Cooper in 1995. His doctoral research focused on automated compiler optimizations for any imperative language. His work there was funded by Ken Kennedy, and led to the development of the sea of nodes intermediate representation, which enables the simultaneous execution of multiple optimizations.

== Career ==
At Sun Microsystems, Click authored the "Sea of Nodes" intermediate representation for the HotSpot JVM. In 2002, he co-founded Azul Systems, serving as Chief JVM Architect and leading the development of specialized Java hardware and non-blocking algorithms, including a high-performance wait-free hash map. In 2012, he co-founded H2O.ai, where he designed the core distributed math engine and in-memory key-value store that allows the platform to perform large-scale parallel computations.

In April 2016, Click joined the financial technology firm Neurensic as chief technology officer, where he oversaw the development of an artificial intelligence-based platform for detecting market manipulation and regulatory risk.

In February 2019, Click was appointed chief technology officer (CTO) of CRATUS Technology, Inc., an engineering firm specializing in Lidar machine perception sensors, and industrial IoT automation systems.
