= Enabling (disambiguation) =

Enable or Enabling can refer to one of the following:

- Enabling, a term in psychotherapy and mental health
- Enabling technology, an invention or innovation, that can be applied to drive radical change in the capabilities of a user or culture
- Enabling act, a piece of legislation by which a legislative body grants an entity power to take certain actions
  - Enabling Act of 1802, authorized the residents of the eastern portion of the Northwest Territory to form the state of Ohio and join the United States
  - Enabling Act of 1889, a United States statute that enabled North Dakota, South Dakota, Montana, and Washington to form state governments and to gain admission as states of the union.
  - Oklahoma Enabling Act, a 1906 law which empowered the people residing in Indian Territory and Oklahoma Territory to elect delegates to a state constitutional convention and subsequently to be admitted to the union as a single state
  - Standard State Zoning Enabling Act, a 1922 model law for U.S. states to enable zoning regulations in their jurisdictions
  - Enabling Act of 1933 (Ermächtigungsgesetz), a 1933 Weimar constitutional amendment that gave the German Cabinet the power to enact laws without the involvement of the Reichstag
  - Rules Enabling Act, a 1934 act of Congress that gave the judicial branch the power to promulgate the Federal Rules of Civil Procedure
- Enabling clause, a clause in the 1979 Tokyo Round of the General Agreement on Tariffs and Trade (GATT)
- Enabling transformation, a compiler optimization that increases the effectiveness of other compiler optimizations
- Enabling Unit, Equal Opportunity Cell based at University College of Medical Sciences and Guru Teg Bahadur Hospital, Delhi

Enable can also refer to:

- Enable Software, Inc., a defunct software company located in Ballston Lake, New York
- EnABLE software, software used in the oil and gas industry
- Geo-enable, the integrated use of Geographic Information
- Enable, Limpopo, a town in the Limpopo province of South Africa
- ENABLE Scotland, a Scottish charity that supports people with learning disabilities
- Enable Ireland, an Irish non-profit organisation providing free services to people with disabilities and their families
- Enable (horse), a thoroughbred racehorse, twice winner of the Prix de l'Arc de Triomphe
- Enable magazine, launched in May 2011 by Glasgow-based magazine publishers DC Publishing (enablemagazine.co.uk)
