= Adept (disambiguation) =

An adept is a member of advanced degree in certain occult, esoteric or philosophical organizations.

Adept may also refer to:

- Adept (band), a post-hardcore band
- Adept (comics), a superheroine in the Marvel comics universe
- Adept (Dungeons & Dragons), a class in the Dungeons & Dragons role-playing game
- Adept (C++ library), an automatic differentiation library
- Adept ICT, South African ISP
- Adepts, characters in the video game series Golden Sun with the ability to use Psynergy
- Adept Technology, a robotics, vision, automation controls company
- Magic Online Adepts, chat moderators for Magic: the Gathering Online trading card game
- ST Adept, a tugboat in service with the Admiralty from 1947 to 1957
- A trade name of the pharmaceutical drug icodextrin
- A trade name of the insecticide diflubenzuron

== Acronyms ==
- ADEPT (medicine) (Antibody directed enzyme prodrug therapy)
- Adobe Digital Editions Protection Technology
- Association of Directors of Environment, Economy, Planning and Transport, UK
- Train Protection & Warning System, incorporating Automated Dead-End Protection Technology (ADEPT), an automated system for stopping trains when they reach a dead end
