= Rematerialization =

Compiler optimization technique

In computer science, rematerialization or remat is a compiler optimization which saves time by recomputing a value instead of loading it from memory. It is typically tightly integrated with register allocation, where it is used as an alternative to spilling registers to memory. It was conceived by Gregory Chaitin, Marc Auslander, Ashok Chandra, John Cocke, Martin Hopkins and Peter Markstein and implemented in the Pl.8 compiler for the 801 Minicomputer in the late 1970s. Later improvements were made by Preston Briggs, Keith D. Cooper, and Linda Torczon in 1992.

Traditional optimizations such as common subexpression elimination and loop invariant hoisting often focus on eliminating redundant computation. Since computation requires CPU cycles, this is usually a good thing, but it has the potentially devastating side effect that it can increase the live ranges of variables and create many new variables, resulting in spills during register allocation. Rematerialization is nearly the opposite: it decreases register pressure by increasing the amount of CPU computation. To avoid adding more computation time than necessary, rematerialization is done only when the compiler can be confident that it will be of benefit — that is, when a register spill to memory would otherwise occur.

Rematerialization works by keeping track of the expression used to compute each variable, using the concept of available expressions. Sometimes the variables used to compute a value are modified, and so can no longer be used to rematerialize that value. The expression is then said to no longer be available. Other criteria must also be fulfilled, for example a maximum complexity on the expression used to rematerialize the value; it would do no good to rematerialize a value using a complex computation that takes more time than a load. Usually the expression must also have no side effects.
