= Keith Cooper =

Keith Cooper may refer to:

- Keith Cooper Jr. (born 2003), American football defensive end
- Keith Cooper (referee) (born 1948), Welsh football referee
- Keith D. Cooper, American computer scientist
