= Unwinding =

Unwinding may refer to:

- Removing frames from a call stack
- Loop unwinding, a software optimization technique
