= Enable, South Africa =

Enable
- Location within Limpopo Location within South Africa
- Coordinates: 24.281°S 30.529°E
- Country: South Africa
- Province: Limpopo
- District: Mopani
- Municipality: Maruleng

Area
  - Total: 3.31 km^{2} (1.28 sq mi)

Population (2011)
  - Total: 2,416
  - Density: 730/km^{2} (1,890/sq mi)

Racial makeup (2011)
  - Black African: 99.9%
  - Other: 0.1%

First languages (2011)
  - Northern Sotho: 94.5%
  - Tsonga: 2.2%
  - English: 1.3%
  - Other: 2.0%
- Time zone: UTC+2 (SAST)

Enable is a town in Mopani District Municipality in the Limpopo province of South Africa.
