= Keith D. Cooper =

American computer scientist

Keith D. Cooper is an American computer scientist and the L. John and Ann H. Doerr Professor of Computational Engineering at Rice University. He has been a professor of Computer Science at Rice since July 1989 and was the chair of that department from 2002 to 2008. As of July 2019, he is the chair of the Department of Computational and Applied Mathematics. His primary research area has been program analysis and optimization. He was one of the founding members of the compiler group at Rice. He and Linda Torczon co-authored the book Engineering a Compiler.

Cooper earned all his degrees at Rice. He has more than 75 technical publications and has supervised 18 Ph.Ds.
