= Context-free language reachability =

Algorithmic problem with applications to program analysis

Context-free language reachability is an algorithmic problem with applications in static program analysis. Given a graph with edge labels from some alphabet and a context-free grammar over that alphabet, the problem is to determine whether there exists a path through the graph such that the concatenation of the labels along the path is a string accepted by the grammar.

== Variations ==
In addition to the decision problem formulation given above, there are several related function problem formulations of CFL-reachability. For brevity, define an L-path to be a path with edge labels in the language of the grammar. Then:

- The all-pairs variant is to determine all pairs of nodes such that there exists an L-path between them.
- The single-source variant is to determine all nodes that are reachable from a given source node via an L-path.
- The single-target variant is to determine all nodes that are the sources of L-paths that end at a given target node.
- The single-source/single-target variant is to determine whether there is an L-path between two given nodes.

== Algorithms ==
There is a relatively simple dynamic programming algorithm for solving all-pairs CFL-reachability. The algorithm requires a normalized grammar, where each production has at most two symbols (terminals or nonterminals) on the right-hand side. The runtime of this algorithm $O(\Sigma^3 n^3)$, where $\Sigma$ is the number of terminals and nonterminals in the normalized grammar (which is linear with respect to the original grammar), and $n$ is the number of nodes in the graph. The algorithm works by repeatedly adding summary edges to the graph: given a production $A ::= B\ C$, if there exists an edge between some nodes x and y labeled with B and an edge between y and z labeled C, then the algorithm adds a new edge labeled A between x and z. This process is repeated until saturation, i.e., until no more summary edges may be added.

== Applications to program analysis ==
Several problems in program analysis can be formulated as CFL-reachability problems, including:

- Interprocedural program slicing
- Many interprocedural data-flow analyses
- Certain kinds of shape analysis
- Flow-insensitive pointer analysis, including variants with different kinds of polyvariance and on-the-fly callgraph construction.

=== Alias analysis ===
Consider an imperative language with pointers, like a simplified C. The program expression graph (PEG) for a program in such a language has a node for each expression in the program, and two kinds of edges:

- A pointer dereference edge labeled d from each pointer dereference expression *e to the corresponding expression e
- An assignment edge labeled a from r to l for each assignment l = r

For each d- and a-edge, there are also corresponding edges in the opposite direction, labeled ~d and ~a, respectively.

The CFL-reachability problem over the PEG and the following grammar encodes the may-alias problem:

M ::= ~d V d
V ::= ~F M? F
F ::= (a M?)*
~F ::= (M? ~a)*

The nonterminal M signifies that two memory locations may alias, i.e., they point to the same value. Nonterminal V signifies that two values may alias, i.e., they hold pointers that may alias. F signifies data-flows, which are sequences of assignments interleaved with memory aliases. ~F is the inverse production of F.

The following grammar is equivalent:

M ::= ~d V d
V ::= (M? ~a)* M? (a M?)*

== Related problems ==
Every CFL-reachability problem can be encoded as a Datalog program.
