= Shmuel Sagiv =

Israeli computer scientist (born 1959)

Mooly (Shmuel) Sagiv
- שמואל שגיב
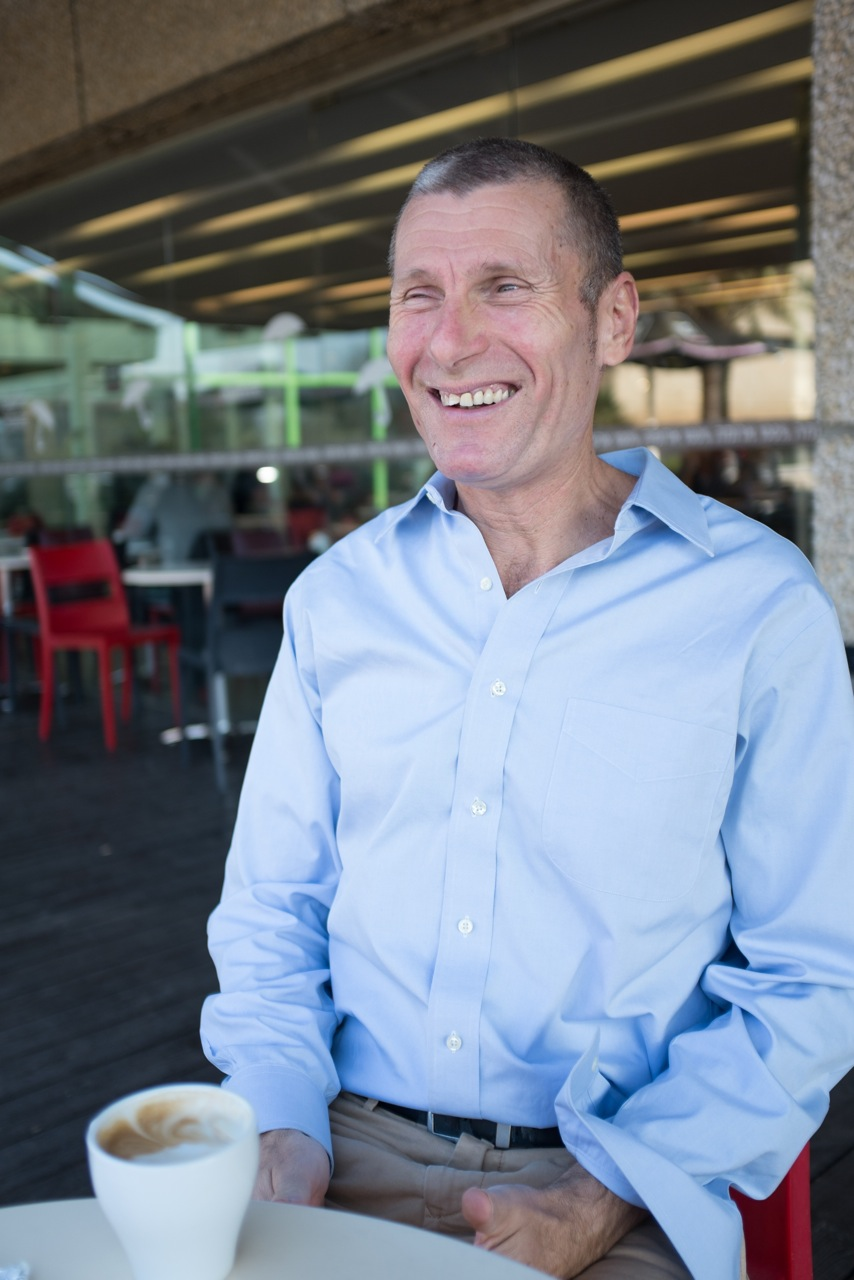
- Born: April 11, 1959 (age 67)
- Education: Technion BSc cum laude 1985, PhD 1991
- Spouse: Dr. Tamar Sagiv
- Children: Aya Sagiv Naama Sagiv Hagar Sagiv
- Scientific career
- Thesis: High-Level Formalisms for Program Flow Analysis and their use in Compiling
- Doctoral advisor: Michael Rodeh, Nissim Francez

Mooly (Shmuel) Sagiv (Hebrew: שמואל שגיב; born 11 April 1959, Israel) is an Israeli computer scientist known for his work on static program analysis. He is currently Chair of Software Systems in the School of Computer Science at Tel Aviv University, and CEO of Certora, a startup company providing formal verification of smart contracts.

Sagiv's research spans areas including static program analysis, shape analysis, abstract interpretation, logic, theorem proving, programming languages, formal methods, data-flow analysis, program slicing, network verification, and smart contracts. His most cited work is on shape analysis via three-valued logic, implemented in the TVLA system.

For his work, Sagiv was awarded the Wolf Foundation Fellowship (1989), IBM Outstanding Technical Achievement Award (1993), Friedrich Wilhelm Bessel Research Award (2002), IBM Faculty Awards (2000-2005), Chair of Software Systems in the School of Computer Science, Tel Aviv University (2008), ACM SIGSOFT Retrospective Impact Paper Award (with Thomas Reps, Susan Horowitz, and Genevieve Rosay, 2011), Microsoft Outstanding Collaborator Award (2016), and ACM Fellow (2016).

An analysis of authorship and collaborations in the Programming Languages research community has called Sagiv "the Kevin Bacon of the PLDI community".

Sagiv is married to Dr. Tamar Sagiv, and together they have three daughters. Aya Sagiv, Naama Sagiv, and Hagar Sagiv.
