= Program dependence graph =

Representation of graph notation

A JavaScript program that exfiltrates a user's user-agent to a remote URL

A Program Dependence Graph (PDG) is a directed graph of a program's control and data dependencies. Nodes represent program statements and edges represent dependencies between these statements.

PDGs are used in optimization, debugging, and understanding program behavior. One example of this is their utilization by compilers during dependence analysis, enabling the optimizing compiler to make transformations to allow for parallelism.

== See also ==
- Dependency graph
- Control-flow graph
- Data-flow analysis
- Static program analysis
