= CPG =

CPG may stand for:

== Organizations ==
- Cameron Pace Group, a 4D technology and production company based in Berlin, Germany
- Catholic Police Guild, of England & Wales, founded in 1914
- Center for the Prevention of Genocide at the United States Holocaust Memory Museum
- Central People's Government, the alternative name of the State Council of China
  - Central People's Government of the People's Republic of China (1949–1954)
- Chingwin Publishing Group, a Taiwanese Publishing Group famous for its large manga selection
- CITIC Publishing Group, a publishing company under CITIC Group based in Beijing, China
- Communist Party of Greece
- Communist Party of Germany
- Communist Party of Grenada
- Compagnie des phosphates de Gafsa, a Tunisian mining company
- CPG Corporation, the corporatized entity of the former Public Works Department of Singapore
- CPI Property Group, a Luxembourg-based property company

== Science ==
- Caffeoyl phenylethanoid glycoside, a type of phenolic compound (see for instance Verbascoside)
- Calorically perfect gas
- Clopidogrel
- CpG ODN, a synthetic TLR9 agonist
- CpG site, a site in DNA
- CpG island, a specialized region of DNA
- Central pattern generator, a neural oscillator, for example generating the respiratory cycle
- abbreviation for Calopogon, an orchid genus containing the "grass pinks"
- Catalog of Principal Galaxies, see Principal Galaxies Catalogue
- Controlled Porosity Glass or Controlled Pore Glass, synonyms for porous glass
- Clavis Patrum Graecorum, volumes published by Brepols of Turnhout in Belgium
- Cycloprolylglycine (traneurocin), an endogenous compound and drug

== Other uses ==
- Canadian Parliamentary Guide
- Chrysler Proving Grounds
- Clinical practice guideline
- Codices Palatini germanici, German-language manuscripts in the Palatine library in Heidelberg
  - CPG 359, the Cod. Pal. germ. 359 illustrated manuscript
- Code property graph, a computer program representation
- Consumer packaged goods, another name for fast-moving consumer goods
- ICAO airline designator for Corporacion Aeroangeles, Mexico
- CPg, a Hungarian punk rock band
- CPG (Cyber PlayGround), codename for the 2001 console Xbox.
