= Susan Horwitz =

Susan Horwitz may refer to:

- Susan B. Horwitz (1955–2014), American computer scientist
- Susan Band Horwitz (born 1937), American biochemist
