= Program analysis (disambiguation) =

Program analysis is the process of automatically analysing the behavior of computer programs.

Program analysis may also refer to:

- Program evaluation, a disciplined way of assessing the merit, value, and worth of projects and programs
- Software performance analysis, the gathering of computer program performance characteristics at run time
