= Tim Teitelbaum =

American computer scientist (born 1943)

- Born: Ray Teitelbaum; April 12, 1943 (age 83)
- Education: Massachusetts Institute of Technology (SB); Carnegie Mellon University (PhD)
- Scientific career
- Workplaces: Cornell University (1973-present); GrammaTech (1988-2019); Institut National de Recherche en Informatique et en Automatique (INRIA) in Rocquencourt, France (1982-83)
- Thesis: Minimum Distance Analysis of Syntax Errors in Computer Programs (1975)
- Doctoral advisor: Nico Habermann
- Doctoral students: Thomas W. Reps; Susan B. Horwitz; Bill Pugh; Yanhong Annie Liu
- Website: www.cs.cornell.edu/info/people/tt/Tim_Teitelbaum.html

(Ray) Tim Teitelbaum (born April 12, 1943, United States) is an American computer scientist known for his early work on integrated development environments (IDEs), syntax-directed editing, and incremental computation. He is Professor Emeritus at Cornell University. As an educator and faculty member of the Cornell University Computer Science Department since 1973, he was recognized for his large-scale teaching of introductory programming, and for his mentoring of highly successful graduate students. As a businessman, he is known for having co-founded GrammaTech, Inc. and for having been its sole CEO from 1988 to 2019.

== Education ==
Teitelbaum was educated at Massachusetts Institute of Technology and Carnegie Mellon University.

== Career and research ==
In 1978, Teitelbaum created the Cornell Program Synthesizer, one of the seminal systems that demonstrated the power of tightly integrating a collection of program development tools, all deeply knowledgeable about a programming language and its semantics, into one unified framework. The Cornell Program Synthesizer used PL/CS, a variant of the PL/C language dialect developed at Cornell. Teitelbaum's more than 45 lectures and demonstrations of this early IDE during 1979–82, as well as the credo of his 1981 paper co-authored with graduate student Thomas Reps, asserted:

Programs are not text; they are hierarchical compositions of computational structures and should be edited, executed, and debugged in an environment that consistently acknowledges and reinforces this viewpoint.

This was followed in 1984 by the Synthesizer Generator, also done in collaboration with Reps, which allowed a Program Synthesizer to be generated for different programming languages based on supplying attribute grammars.

Motivated by the importance of immediate feedback in interactive systems such as IDEs, Teitelbaum's research in the 1980s and 1990s focused on the problem of incremental computation:

Given a program P written in language L, and the result of executing P on input x, how can one efficiently determine the result of running P on input x′, where the difference between x and x′ is some small increment x′-x.

In a body of work with his graduate students, Teitelbaum investigated this problem for a range of languages L that included attribute grammars, SQL, first-order functional languages, and the lambda calculus. In addition to incremental evaluation methods, the work also included program transformation methods, i.e., the automatic derivation from P of an incremental program P′, where executing P′ on previous result P(x), increment x′-x, and auxiliary information retained from previous executions, efficiently performs the same computation as executing P on input x′.

Teitelbaum's work at GrammaTech aimed at the design and implementation of tools that assist in making software safer and more secure. Techniques include static program analysis and dynamic program analysis of both source code and machine code.

Teitelbaum authored a free language-agnostic programming textbook, Principled Programming — Introduction to Coding in Any Imperative Language, in 2023.

=== Awards and honors ===
Teitelbaum was co-recipient of the Association for Computing Machinery SIGSOFT Retrospective Impact Paper Award (2010) for his 1984 paper co-authored with Thomas Reps on the Synthesizer Generator.
