= Control dependency =

Control dependency is a situation in which a program instruction executes if the previous instruction evaluates in a way that allows its execution.

An instruction B has a control dependency on a preceding instruction A if the outcome of A determines whether B should be executed or not. In the following example, the instruction $S_2$ has a control dependency on instruction $S_1$. However, $S_3$ does not depend on $S_1$ because $S_3$ is always executed irrespective of the outcome of $S_1$.

S1.         if (a == b)
S2.             a = a + b
S3.         b = a + b

Intuitively, there is control dependence between two statements A and B if

- B could be possibly executed after A
- The outcome of the execution of A will determine whether B will be executed or not.

A typical example is that there are control dependences between the condition part of an if statement and the statements in its true/false bodies.

A formal definition of control dependence can be presented as follows:

A statement $S_2$ is said to be control dependent on another statement $S_1$ iff

- there exists a path $P$ from $S_1$ to $S_2$ such that every statement $S_i$ ≠ $S_1$ within $P$ will be followed by $S_2$ in each possible path to the end of the program and
- $S_1$ will not necessarily be followed by $S_2$, i.e. there is an execution path from $S_1$ to the end of the program that does not go through $S_2$.

Expressed with the help of (post-)dominance the two conditions are equivalent to

- $S_2$ post-dominates all $S_i$
- $S_2$ does not post-dominate $S_1$

== Construction of control dependences ==
Control dependences are essentially the dominance frontier in the reverse graph of the control-flow graph (CFG). Thus, one way of constructing them, would be to construct the post-dominance frontier of the CFG, and then reversing it to obtain a control dependence graph.

The following is a pseudo-code for constructing the post-dominance frontier:

for each X in a bottom-up traversal of the post-dominator tree do:
    PostDominanceFrontier(X) ← ∅
    for each Y ∈ Predecessors(X) do:
        if immediatePostDominator(Y) ≠ X:
            then PostDominanceFrontier(X) ← PostDominanceFrontier(X) ∪ {Y}
    done
    for each Z ∈ Children(X) do:
        for each Y ∈ PostDominanceFrontier(Z) do:
            if immediatePostDominator(Y) ≠ X:
                then PostDominanceFrontier(X) ← PostDominanceFrontier(X) ∪ {Y}
        done
    done
done

Here, Children(X) is the set of nodes in the CFG that are immediately post-dominated by X, and Predecessors(X) are the set of nodes in the CFG that directly precede X in the CFG. Note that node X shall be processed only after all its Children have been processed. Once the post-dominance frontier map is computed, reversing it will result in a map from the nodes in the CFG to the nodes that have a control dependence on them.

== See also ==
- Dependence analysis
- Data dependency
- Loop dependence analysis § Control dependence
