= Yanhong Annie Liu =

Chinese-American computer scientist

- Born: May 20, 1965 (age 61); Beijing, China
- Education: Cornell University; Tsinghua University; Peking University
- Scientific career
- Fields: Languages and algorithms Design and optimization
- Workplaces: Cornell University; Stony Brook University
- Thesis: Incremental Computation: A Semantics-Based Systematic Transformational Approach (1995)
- Doctoral advisor: Tim Teitelbaum
- Website: www3.cs.stonybrook.edu/~liu

Yanhong Annie Liu (born May 20, 1965) is a computer scientist and professor of computer science at Stony Brook University where she works on new programming languages, software systems, algorithms, program design, optimizing, analysis, and transformations, intelligent systems, distributed computing systems, and computer security.

== Early life and education ==
Liu studied computer science at Peking University earning a Bachelor of Science (B.Sc.). She moved to Tsinghua University for her graduate studies, earning a Master of Engineering (M.Eng.) in computer science in 1988. Liu was a graduate student at Cornell University, where she earned a Doctor of Philosophy (Ph.D.) in 1996.

== Research and career ==
As a postdoctoral researcher, Liu worked on language processing at Cornell University. Liu joined Indiana University in 1996 as an assistant professor. She moved to Stony Brook University in 2000, where she was made professor in 2008. Liu was awarded the State University of New York Chancellor's Award for Excellence in 2010.

Liu leads the Design and Analysis Research Laboratory at Stony Brook University. She works on programming languages, algorithms, and distributed systems.

She is a member of the International Federation for Information Processing (IFIP) IFIP Working Group 2.1 on Algorithmic Languages and Calculi, which specified, supports, and maintains the languages ALGOL 60 and ALGOL 68.

=== Publications ===
Her publications include:

- Liu, Yanhong Annie (2013). Systematic Program Design: From Clarity to Efficiency. Cambridge, England: Cambridge University Press. ISBN 978-1107036604.
- Kifer, Michael; Liu, Yanhong Annie (2018). Declarative Logic Programming: Theory, Systems, and Applications. San Rafael, California, United States: Morgan & Claypool. ISBN 978-1-970001-99-0.
