= Program slicing =

Set of software engineering methods

In computer programming, program slicing is the computation of the set of program statements, the program slice, that may affect the values at some point of interest, referred to as a slicing criterion. Program slicing can be used in debugging to locate source of errors more easily. Other applications of slicing include software maintenance, optimization, program analysis, and information flow control.

Slicing techniques have been seeing a rapid development since the original definition by Mark Weiser. At first, slicing was only static, i.e., applied on the source code with no other information than the source code. Bogdan Korel and Janusz Laski introduced dynamic slicing, which works on a specific execution of the program (for a given execution trace). Other forms of slicing exist, for instance path slicing.

== Static slicing ==
Based on the original definition of Weiser, informally, a static program slice S consists of all statements in program P that may affect the value of variable v in a statement x. The slice is defined for a slicing criterion C=(x,v) where x is a statement in program P and v is variable in x. A static slice includes all the statements that can affect the value of variable v at statement x for any possible input. Static slices are computed by backtracking dependencies between statements. More specifically, to compute the static slice for (x,v), we first find all statements that can directly affect the value of v before statement x is encountered. Recursively, for each statement y which can affect the value of v in statement x, we compute the slices for all variables z in y that affect the value of v. The union of all those slices is the static slice for (x,v).

=== Example ===
For example, consider the C program below. Let's compute the slice for ( write(sum), sum ). The value of sum is directly affected by the statements "sum = sum + i + w" if N>1 and "int sum = 0" if N <= 1. So, slice( write(sum), sum) is the union of three slices and the "int sum = 0" statement which has no dependencies:

1. slice( sum = sum + i + w, sum),
2. slice( sum = sum + i + w, i),
3. slice( sum = sum + i + w, w), and
4. { int sum=0 }.

It is fairly easy to see that slice( sum = sum + i + w, sum) consists of "sum = sum + i + w" and "int sum = 0" because those are the only two prior statements that can affect the value of sum at "sum = sum + i + w". Similarly, slice( sum = sum + i + w, i) only contains "for(i = 1; i < N; ++i) {" and slice( sum = sum + i + w, w) only contains the statement "int w = 7".

When we union all of those statements, we do not have executable code, so to make the slice an executable slice we merely add the end brace for the for loop and the declaration of i. The resulting static executable slice is shown below the original code below.

int i;
int sum = 0;
int product = 1;
int w = 7;
for(i = 1; i < N; ++i) {
  sum = sum + i + w;
  product = product * i;
}
write(sum);
write(product);

The static executable slice for criteria (write(sum), sum) is the new program shown below.

int i;
int sum = 0;
int w = 7;
for(i = 1; i < N; ++i) {
  sum = sum + i + w;
}
write(sum);

In fact, most static slicing techniques, including Weiser's own technique, will also remove the write(sum) statement. Since, at the statement write(sum), the value of sum is not dependent on the statement itself. Often a slice for a particular statement x will include more than one variable. If V is a set of variables in a statement x, then the slice for (x, V) is the union of all slices with criteria (x, v) where v is a variable in the set V.

== Dynamic slicing ==
Dynamic slicing makes use of information about a particular execution of a program. A dynamic slice contains all statements that actually affect the value of a variable at a program point for a particular execution of the program rather than all statements that may have affected the value of a variable at a program point for any arbitrary execution of the program.

An example to clarify the difference between static and dynamic slicing: Consider a small piece of a program unit, in which there is an iteration block containing an if-else block. There are a few statements in both the if and else blocks that have an effect on a variable. In the case of static slicing, since the whole program unit is looked at irrespective of a particular execution of the program, the affected statements in both blocks would be included in the slice. But, in the case of dynamic slicing we consider a particular execution of the program, wherein the if block gets executed and the affected statements in the else block do not get executed. So, that is why in this particular execution case, the dynamic slice would contain only the statements in the if block.

== See also ==
- Software maintenance
- Dependence analysis
- Reaching definition
- Data dependency
- Frama-C a tool which implements slicing algorithms on C programs.
- Partial dead code elimination

== Sources ==
- Mark Weiser. "Program slicing". Proceedings of the 5th International Conference on Software Engineering, pages 439–449, IEEE Computer Society Press, March 1981.
- Mark Weiser. "Program slicing". IEEE Transactions on Software Engineering, Volume 10, Issue 4, pages 352–357, IEEE Computer Society Press, July 1984.
- Susan Horwitz, Thomas Reps, and David Binkley, Interprocedural slicing using dependence graphs, ACM Transactions on Programming Languages and Systems, Volume 12, Issue 1, pages 26-60, January 1990.
- Frank Tip. "A survey of program slicing techniques". Journal of Programming Languages, Volume 3, Issue 3, pages 121–189, September 1995.
- David Binkley and Keith Brian Gallagher. "Program slicing". Advances in Computers, Volume 43, pages 1–50, Academic Press, 1996.
- Andrea de Lucia. "Program slicing: Methods and applications", International Workshop on Source Code Analysis and Manipulation, pages 142-149, 2001, IEEE Computer Society Press.
- Mark Harman and Robert Hierons. "An overview of program slicing", Software Focus, Volume 2, Issue 3, pages 85–92, January 2001.
- David Binkley and Mark Harman. "A survey of empirical results on program slicing", Advances in Computers, Volume 62, pages 105-178, Academic Press, 2004.
- Jens Krinke. "Program Slicing", In Handbook of Software Engineering and Knowledge Engineering, Volume 3: Recent Advances. World Scientific Publishing, 2005
- Silva, Josep. "A vocabulary of program slicing-based techniques", ACM Computing Surveys, Volume 44, Issue 3, Association for Computing Machinery, June 2012
