= Catholic Police Guild =

- Logo of the Catholic Police Guild
- Abbreviation: CPG
- Formation: 11 June 1914; 112 years ago
- Founder: Monsignor Martin Howlett
- Founded at: Westminster Cathedral; London, England
- Type: Religious association/fraternal organisation
- Legal status: Active
- Region served: England and Wales
- Members: Catholic police officers, police staff, support officers, and Friends supporters
- Chairman: Paul Connolly (as of 2022–present)
- Main organ: National Executive Committee
- Parent organisation: Catholic Bishops' Conference of England and Wales (approval of Constitution and Rules)
- Website: http://www.catholicpoliceguild.co.uk/

The Catholic Police Guild (CPG) of England & Wales was founded in 1914 as the Metropolitan and City Catholic Police Guild. This was an association for Catholic Police men and women, and approved by the Roman Catholic Archdiocese of Westminster, in response to representations made by Catholics serving in the Metropolitan and City of London Police Forces. The Patron Saint of the Catholic Police Guild is Saint Michael, the Archangel.

The CPG has a Constitution and Rules approved by the Catholic Bishops' Conference of England and Wales, and a National Executive Committee elected by members each year. The NEC invites a member to act as chairman and may also select a President, who serves a three-year term.

In 1974 the Guild became a national association with membership open to Police Officers serving in the Police Forces in the rest of England and Wales. More recently membership has been opened up to Police Staff & Police Community Support Officers. The CPG also has a Friends category of membership for other civilian supporters. The Guild has had a significant resurgence over the last couple of years. It is particularly experiencing growth in the North-West of England.

The Guild undertakes bi-annual pilgrimages to various important holy places, including Rome, the Holy Land, Fátima, Portugal, Santiago de Compostela in Spain and Poland. In 1985 the Guild went on pilgrimage to Rome to celebrate its seventieth year of foundation, and were addressed by Pope John Paul II on Friday, 12 April 1985.

CPG members often help with stewarding duties at Westminster Cathedral, and every October, Guild members carry the statue of Our Lady in procession from Westminster Cathedral to Brompton Oratory on behalf of the Rosary Crusade of Reparation. Both in 1982 with the visit of Pope John Paul II and in 2010 with the visit of Pope Benedict XVI, the Catholic Police Guild assisted with stewarding. In 1982, Michael Jeffers, a Chief Superintendent in the Metropolitan Police as well as the Chairman of the Guild, was made a Knight of St Gregory by Cardinal Basil Hume in recognition of his efforts leading the stewarding.

== List of Chairpersons ==
Chairman	Tenure	Force
Paul Connolly	2022 - Present	Merseyside
James Milligan	2017 - 2022	Merseyside
Donna Allen	2015 - 2017	GMP
Andrew Nattrass	2012–2015	Norfolk
Chris Sloan	2010–2012	Metropolitan
Patrick Somerville	2008–2010	Metropolitan
John Daly	2006–2008	Metropolitan
Andrew Bayes	2003–2006	Metropolitan
Michael O'Brien	2000-2003	Metropolitan
Bernard Luckhurst	1993-2000	Metropolitan
Brian Goddard	1990-1993	Metropolitan
Ted Keal	1986-1990	Metropolitan
Mike Jeffers	1982-1986	Metropolitan
Patrick Somerville	1980-1982	Metropolitan
Robert Gravells	1976-1980	Metropolitan
Patrick Somerville	1973-1976	Metropolitan
Charles Sheath	1965-1967	Metropolitan
Richard M Ford	1963- 1965	Metropolitan

== Catholic Police Guild of Scotland ==
A Catholic Police Guild used to exist in Scotland. In recent years the Guild in this country ceased to operate. However, negotiations are currently underway to revive the Catholic Police Guild in Scotland.
