= Polyvariance =

In program analysis, a polyvariant or context-sensitive analysis (as opposed to a monovariant or context-insensitive analysis) analyzes each function multiple times—typically once at each call site—to improve the precision of the analysis. Polyvariance is common in data-flow and pointer analyses.

Forms of polyvariance include:

- Call-site sensitivity
- The Cartesian product algorithm
- Object sensitivity
- Type sensitivity

The first two are more often used for dataflow analyses, the latter two are more frequently used for pointer analyses.
