= Thomas W. Reps =

American computer scientist (born 1956)

Thomas William Reps
- Born: 28 May 1956 (age 70)
- Education: Harvard University, B.A., cum laude, 1977; Cornell University, M.S., 1982, PhD, 1985
- Scientific career
- Workplaces: University of Wisconsin–Madison (1985–present); GrammaTech (1988–2019); Institut National de Recherche en Informatique et en Automatique (INRIA) in Rocquencourt, France (1982-83); University of Copenhagen (1993-94); Consiglio Nazionale delle Ricerche in Pisa, Italy (2000–2001); University Paris Diderot (2007–2008)
- Thesis: Generating Language-Based Environments (1982)
- Doctoral advisor: Tim Teitelbaum

Thomas W. Reps (born 28 May 1956, United States) is an American computer scientist known for his contributions to automatic program analysis. He holds the J. Barkley Rosser Professor & Rajiv and Ritu Batra Chair in the Computer Sciences Department of the University of Wisconsin–Madison, which he joined in 1985, and from which he retired in 2024.

Reps is the author or co-author of four books and more than one hundred seventy-five papers describing his research. His work has covered a wide variety of topics, including program slicing, data-flow analysis, pointer analysis, model checking, computer security, instrumentation (computer programming), language-based program-development environments, the use of program profiling in software testing, software renovation, incremental algorithms, and attribute grammars.

Reps’s work for many years focused on static analysis of stripped (binary) executables, and methods that—without relying on symbol-table or debugging information—recover intermediate representations that are similar to those the intermediate phases of a compiler creates for a program written in a high-level language. The goal is to provide a disassembler or decompiler platform that an analyst can use to understand the workings of COTS components, plugins, mobile code, and DLLs, as well as memory snapshots of worms and virus-infected code.

Reps was President and Co-founder of GrammaTech, Inc.

== Awards and honors ==
Reps has been the recipient of the following awards:

- ACM Doctoral Dissertation Award (1983)
- National Science Foundation Presidential Young Investigator Award (1986)
- Packard Fellowship (1988)
- Humboldt Research Award (2000)
- Guggenheim Fellowship (2000)
- Horwitz, S., Reps T., and Binkley, D., "Interprocedural slicing using dependence graphs" selected as one of the 50 most influential papers from ACM PLDI, 1979-99 (2002)
- Institute for Scientific Information "Highly Cited Researcher"(2003)
- European Association for Programming Languages and Systems Best-Paper Award at ETAPS (with G. Balakrishnan) (2004)
- ACM Fellow (2005)
- European Association for Programming Languages and Systems Best-Paper Award at ETAPS (with J. Lim) (2008)
- ACM SIGSOFT Retrospective Impact Paper Award (with T. Teitelbaum) (2010)
- ACM SIGSOFT Retrospective Impact Paper Award (with S. Horwitz, M. Sagiv, and G. Rosay) (2011)
- Foreign member of Academia Europaea (2013)
- Ranked 8th (citations) and 4th (field rating) on Microsoft Academic Search's list of most-highly cited authors in the field of Programming Languages (2013), and 23rd (citations) and 13th (field rating) on its list of most-highly cited authors in the field of Software Engineering (2013)
- ACM SIGPLAN Programming Languages Achievement Award (2017)
