= Dependence analysis =

In compiler theory, dependence analysis produces execution-order constraints between statements/instructions. Broadly speaking, a statement S2 depends on S1 if S1 must be executed before S2. Broadly, there are two classes of dependencies--control dependencies and data dependencies.

Dependence analysis determines whether it is safe to reorder or parallelize statements.

== Control dependencies ==
Control dependency is a situation in which a program instruction executes if the previous instruction evaluates in a way that allows its execution.

A statement S2 is control dependent on S1 (written $S1\ \delta^c\ S2$) if and only if S2's execution is conditionally guarded by S1. S2 is control dependent on S1 if and only if $S1 \in PDF(S2)$ where $PDF(S)$ is the post dominance frontier of statement $S$. The following is an example of such a control dependence:

S1       if x > 2 goto L1
S2       y := 3   
S3   L1: z := y + 1

Here, S2 only runs if the predicate in S1 is false.

== Data dependencies ==
A data dependence arises from two statements which access or modify the same resource.

=== Flow(True) dependence ===
A statement S2 is flow dependent on S1 (written $S1\ \delta^f\ S2$) if and only if S1 modifies a resource that S2 reads and S1 precedes S2 in execution. The following is an example of a flow dependence (RAW: Read After Write):

S1       x := 10
S2       y := x + c

=== Antidependence ===
A statement S2 is antidependent on S1 (written $S1\ \delta^a\ S2$) if and only if S2 modifies a resource that S1 reads and S1 precedes S2 in execution. The following is an example of an antidependence (WAR: Write After Read):

S1       x := y + c
S2       y := 10

Here, S2 sets the value of y but S1 reads a prior value of y.

=== Output dependence ===
A statement S2 is output dependent on S1 (written $S1\ \delta^o\ S2$) if and only if S1 and S2 modify the same resource and S1 precedes S2 in execution. The following is an example of an output dependence (WAW: Write After Write):

S1       x := 10
S2       x := 20

Here, S2 and S1 both set the variable x.

=== Input dependence ===
A statement S2 is input dependent on S1 (written $S1\ \delta^i\ S2$) if and only if S1 and S2 read the same resource and S1 precedes S2 in execution. The following is an example of an input dependence (RAR: Read-After-Read):

S1       y := x + 3
S2       z := x + 5

Here, S2 and S1 both access the variable x. This dependence does not prohibit reordering.

== Loop dependencies ==
The problem of computing dependencies within loops, which is a significant and nontrivial problem, is tackled by loop dependence analysis, which extends the dependence framework given here.

== See also ==
- Program analysis (computer science)
- Automatic parallelization
- Automatic vectorization
- Loop dependence analysis
- Frameworks supporting the polyhedral model
- Hazard (computer architecture)
- Program slicing
- Dead code elimination
