= Susan B. Horwitz =

American computer scientist, academic, educator

- Born: January 6, 1955; Berkeley, California, U.S.
- Died: June 11, 2014 (aged 59); Madison, Wisconsin, U.S.
- Education: Cornell University; Wesleyan University
- Known for: programming languages software engineering
- Awards: ACM SIGSOFT Retrospective Impact Paper Award (2011)
- Scientific career
- Fields: Computer Science
- Workplaces: University of Wisconsin–Madison (1985–2014); Institut National de Recherche en Informatique et en Automatique (INRIA) in Rocquencourt, France (1982–83); University of Copenhagen (1993–94); Consiglio Nazionale delle Ricerche in Pisa, Italy (2000–2001); University Paris Diderot (2007–2008)
- Doctoral advisor: Tim Teitelbaum
- Website: pages.cs.wisc.edu/~horwitz/

Susan Beth Horwitz (January 6, 1955 – June 11, 2014) was an American computer scientist noted for her research on programming languages and software engineering, and in particular on program slicing and dataflow-analysis.

== Early life and education ==
Horwitz was born in Berkeley California January 6, 1955 but spent her childhood in Syracuse New York. Horwitz received an A.B. magna cum laude in Ethnomusicology from Wesleyan University in 1977, a M.S. in Computer Science from Cornell University in 1982 and a Ph.D in Computer Science from Cornell University in 1985. She joined the Department of Computer Science at the University of Wisconsin in Madison as an assistant professor in 1985. She was promoted to associate professor in 1991, and to professor in 1996. She was associate chair from 2004 to 2007. she had two year-long visiting professor appointments in France and one in Denmark and Italy. Horwitz retired in 2014 and was awarded the status of emeritus professor. She died on June 11, 2014, aged 59, from stomach cancer. Horwitz was survived by her husband, Thomas Reps.

== Career ==
Horwitz made contributions to the software development industry. She developed an algorithm in 1995 that Microsoft introduced into its SLAM tool which detected the bugs that were causing about 85% of the crashes in Windows.

Horwitz was ranked 37th for programming languages in Microsoft Academic Search database at the time of her death (2014).

She was an award-winning teacher at her institution and was the founder of Peer Led Team Learning for Computer Science (PLTLCS), creating the Wisconsin Emerging Scholars-Computer Science (WES-CS) program in 2004. She served as the WES-CS director from 2014–2014. In 2006, together with co-PI Barbara G. Ryder, she received an NSF grant to add to Microsoft funding for the WES-CS program. The program included direct recruitment of first year students from underrepresented groups and implemented team-learning techniques to the computer science department's introductory classes. This grant funding allowed creation of a collaboration between eight schools implementing peer-led learning (PLTLCS), including the University of Wisconsin–Madison with Horwitz, Duke University, Georgia Tech, Rutgers University, University of Wisconsin at Milwaukee, Purdue University, Beloit College, and Loyola College. This consortium published a 2009 paper that demonstrated that active recruiting combined with peer-led team learning is an effective approach to attracting and retaining underrepresented students in an introductory Computer Science class.

Horwitz was noted for her leadership in promoting computing in high schools. She was a member of the Educational Testing Services Advanced Placement Computer Science Test Development Committee for ten years (1987–1997) including chairing the committee for five years (1992–1997) at a time when the programming language for the exam changed from Pascal to C^{++}.

== Awards ==
=== Notable papers ===
Horwitz earned several awards for her research. Her 1988 paper "Interprocedural slicing using dependence graphs" (with T. Reps and D. Binkley) was selected as one of the 50 best papers to appear at the ACM SIGPLAN Conference on Programming Language Design and Implementation (PLDI) during the period 1979–99. Her paper "Demand interprocedural dataflow analysis" (with Thomas Reps and Mooly Sagiv) in SIGSOFT '95 was selected as one of the best papers at the conference invited for submission to ACM Transactions on Software Engineering and Methodology 1995. The paper "Precise interprocedural dataflow analysis with applications to constant propagation" (with M. Saviv and T. Reps) in TAPSOFT '95 was selected as one of the best papers in the conference and invited for submission to Theoretical Computer Science 1995. Her paper "Reducing the Overhead of Dynamic Analysis" (with S. Yong) in 2002 at the Second Workshop on Runtime Verification was selected as one of the best papers at the workshop and invited for submission to a special issue of the journal Formal Methods in System Design.In 2011, she received an ACM SIGSOFT Retrospective Impact Paper Award (with T. Reps, M. Sagiv, and G. Rosay) for their paper "Speeding up slicing", which appeared at the SIGSOFT Symposium on Foundations of Software Engineering (FSE) in 1994.

=== Awards ===
- NSF Presidential Young Investigator Award (1989)
- University of Wisconsin College of Letters and Sciences Teaching Excellence Award, 1992
- University of Wisconsin William H. Kiekhofer Excellence in Teaching Award, 1993
- University of Wisconsin Computer Sciences Department Carolyn Rosner Excellent Educator Award, 1997
- University of Wisconsin College of Letters and Science Distinguished Honors Faculty Award, 2011
