= Upwards exposed uses =

Computer program analysis technique

In compiler theory, upwards exposed uses or reachable uses are all uses of a variable that are reachable from a point in the program. A "use" of a variable is a point or statement where that variable is referenced (read) but not changed. A "use" of a variable A is reachable from a point p if there exists a control-flow path in the control-flow graph from p to the use, with no definition of A on the path.

A reachable uses analysis is a data-flow analysis to calculate all reachable uses of a program. It is very similar to the liveness analysis. A variable is "live" at a point in the program if it has one or more reachable uses. Compared to the liveness analysis, reachable uses analysis provides additional information where the variable is used.

== Uses ==
Upwards exposed uses occurs in the copy propagation stage of program compilation. During the copy propagation stage, instances of a target are replaced with assignments to their values. During this process, it is necessary for the compiler to understand which instances of a target are being accessed so that appropriate substitution may occur, related to the concept of reaching definition in reaching analysis. This is done with the purpose of simplifying code before execution: if the number of upwards exposed uses of an assignment is zero, it does not contribute to the end result of the code and can be safely removed. This is also useful for improving code security during the compilation stages.

== Example ==
Consider the following pseudocode:

x = 1
y = z

if False:
    x = 0
else:
    x = y + 2

It is safe to assume that line 5 will never occur, as demonstrated by the number of upwards exposed uses for this point being zero. This can therefore be simplified:

y = z
x = z + 2

This leads to a result that is less complex to compile and more efficient to run. This also meets the definition of reaching definition: In this context, upwards flow analysis was the technique used to demonstrate the needs for reaching definition. Additional techniques allow for more complex analysis of more deeply intertwined or complex control flow problems, such as those with various forms of loops.

== See also ==
- Dead code elimination
- Reaching definition
- Live-variable analysis
