= SCCP =

SCCP may refer to:

- Sabah Chinese Consolidated Party, a defunct political party from state of Sabah, Malaysia
- The Scientific Committee on Consumer Products of the European Commission's Directorate-General for Health and Consumer Protection
- Skinny Client Control Protocol, a VoIP terminal control protocol defined by Cisco Systems, Inc.
- Signalling Connection Control Part, from ITU-T recommendation Q.713, is the network protocol for Signalling System 7 networks.
- South Carolina College of Pharmacy.
- Sparse conditional constant propagation, an optimisation technique used in compilers.
- Sport Club Corinthians Paulista
- Short-chained chlorinated paraffins
