= GCSE (disambiguation) =

The GCSE is the General Certificate of Secondary Education, a British qualification (introduced 1986).

GCSE can also refer to:

- "Ghetto Children Sex Education", a 2005 hip-hop single by Blak Twang
- Global common subexpression elimination, in computer science
- Grand Cross of the Saxe-Ernestine House Order, Germany (1833–1981)
- Grand Cross of the Military Order of Saint James of the Sword, Portugal
