= Reaching definition =

Concept in computer science

In compiler theory, a reaching definition is a definition of a variable that may reach a particular point in a program without another definition of the same variable occurring along the intervening control-flow path. For example, in the following code:

d1 : y := 3
d2 : x := y

d1 is a reaching definition for d2. In the following, example, however:

d1 : y := 3
d2 : y := 4
d3 : x := y

d1 is no longer a reaching definition for d3, because d2 kills its reach: the value defined in d1 is no longer available and cannot reach d3.

== As analysis ==
The similarly named reaching definitions analysis is a data-flow analysis that statically determines which definitions may reach a given point in the code. Because of its simplicity, it is often used as a canonical example of data-flow analysis in compiler textbooks. The data-flow confluence operator used is set union, and the analysis is a forward data-flow analysis. Reaching definitions can be used to compute use-def chains.

The data-flow equations used for a given basic block $S$ in reaching definitions are:

- ${\rm REACH}*{\rm in}[S] = \bigcup*{p \in pred[S]} {\rm REACH}_{\rm out}[p]$
- ${\rm REACH}*{\rm out}[S] = {\rm GEN}[S] \cup ({\rm REACH}*{\rm in}[S] - {\rm KILL}[S])$

In other words, the set of reaching definitions going into $S$ consists of all reaching definitions coming from $S$'s predecessors, $pred[S]$. $pred[S]$ consists of the basic blocks with control flow edges leading into $S$. The reaching definitions coming out of $S$ are the reaching definitions entering $S$, minus those whose variables are redefined in $S$, together with any new definitions generated within $S$.

For a generic instruction, we define the ${\rm GEN}$ and ${\rm KILL}$ sets as follows:

- ${\rm GEN}[d : y \leftarrow f(x_1,\cdots,x_n)] = {d}$, a set containing the definition generated by the instruction
- ${\rm KILL}[d : y \leftarrow f(x_1,\cdots,x_n)] = {\rm DEFS}[y] - {d}$, the set of other definitions of $y$ killed by the instruction

where ${\rm DEFS}[y]$ is the set of all definitions that assign to the variable $y$. Here $d$ is a unique label attached to the assigning instruction; thus, the domain of values in reaching definitions consists of these instruction labels.

== Worklist algorithm ==
Reaching definitions are usually calculated using an iterative worklist algorithm.

Input: control-flow graph CFG = (Nodes, Edges, Entry, Exit)

// Initialize
for all CFG nodes n in N,
    OUT[n] = emptyset; // can optimize by OUT[n] = GEN[n];

// put all nodes into the changed set
// N is all nodes in graph,
Changed = N;

// Iterate 
while (Changed != emptyset)
{
    choose a node n in Changed;
    // remove it from the changed set
    Changed = Changed -{ n };

    // init IN[n] to be empty
    IN[n] = emptyset;

    // calculate IN[n] from predecessors' OUT[p]
    for all nodes p in predecessors(n)
         IN[n] = IN[n] Union OUT[p];

    oldout = OUT[n]; // save old OUT[n]
    
    // update OUT[n] using transfer function f_n ()
    OUT[n] = GEN[n] Union (IN[n] -KILL[n]);

    // any change to OUT[n] compared to previous value?
    if (OUT[n] changed) // compare oldout vs. OUT[n]
    {    
        // if yes, put all successors of n into the changed set
        for all nodes s in successors(n)
             Changed = Changed U { s };
    }
}

== See also ==
- Dead-code elimination
- Loop-invariant code motion
- Reachable uses
- Static single assignment form
