= Available expression =

Optimization method in software compilers

In the field of compiler optimizations, available expressions is an analysis algorithm that determines for each point in the program the set of expressions that need not be recomputed. Those expressions are said to be available at such a point. To be available on a program point, the operands of the expression should not be modified on any path from the occurrence of that expression to the program point.

The analysis is an example of a forward data flow analysis problem. A set of available expressions is maintained. Each statement is analysed to see whether it changes the operands of one or more available expressions. This yields sets of available expressions at the end of each basic block, known as the outset in data flow analysis terms. An expression is available at the start of a basic block if it is available at the end of each of the basic block's predecessors. This gives a set of equations in terms of available sets, which can be solved by an iterative algorithm.

Available expression analysis is used to do global common subexpression elimination (CSE). If an expression is available at a point, there is no need to re-evaluate it.
