= Unreferenced variable =

Variable which is defined but never used

An unreferenced variable in the source code of a computer program is a variable that is defined but which is never used. This may result in a harmless waste of memory. Many compilers detect such variables and do not allocate storage for them (i.e., "optimize away" their storage), generally also issuing a warning as they do.

Some coding guideline documents consider an unreferenced variable to be a symptom of a potential coding fault. On the other hand, unreferenced variables can be used as temporary placeholders to indicate further expected future developments in the code.

== Examples ==
C:

 int main(void)
 {
   int i, j;
   for (i=0; i<10; i++)
      printf("%d", i);
   return 0;
 }

In this example, j is an unreferenced variable.
