= Object binding =

Several object binding times exist in object oriented systems. Java, for example, has late binding leading to more loosely coupled systems (at least for deployment).
