= Register allocation =

Computer compiler optimization technique

In compiler optimization, register allocation is the process of assigning local automatic variables and expression results to a limited number of processor registers.

Register allocation can happen over a basic block (local register allocation), over a whole function/procedure (global register allocation), or across function boundaries traversed via call-graph (interprocedural register allocation). When done per function/procedure the calling convention may require insertion of save/restore around each call-site.

== Context ==
=== Principle ===
Different number of general-purpose registers in the most common architectures
Architecture	32 bit	64 bit
ARM	15	31
Intel x86	8	16
MIPS	32	32
POWER/PowerPC	32	32
RISC-V	15/31	15/31
SPARC	31	31

In many programming languages, the programmer may use any number of variables. The computer can quickly read and write registers in the CPU, so the computer program runs faster when more variables can be in the CPU's registers. Also, sometimes code accessing registers is more compact, so the code is smaller, and can be fetched faster if it uses registers rather than memory. However, the number of registers is limited. Therefore, when the compiler is translating code to machine-language, it must decide how to allocate variables to the limited number of registers in the CPU.

Not all variables are in use (or "live") at the same time, so, over the lifetime of a program, a given register may be used to hold different variables. However, two variables in use at the same time cannot be assigned to the same register without corrupting one of the variables. If there are not enough registers to hold all the variables, some variables may be moved to and from RAM. This process is called "spilling" the registers. Over the lifetime of a program, a variable can be both spilled and stored in registers: this variable is then considered as "split". Accessing RAM is significantly slower than accessing registers and so a compiled program runs slower. Therefore, an optimizing compiler aims to assign as many variables to registers as possible. A high "Register pressure" is a technical term that means that more spills and reloads are needed; it is defined by Braun et al. as "the number of simultaneously live variables at an instruction".

In addition, some computer designs cache frequently-accessed registers. So, programs can be further optimized by assigning the same register to a source and destination of a move instruction whenever possible. This is especially important if the compiler is using an intermediate representation such as static single-assignment form (SSA). In particular, when SSA is not fully optimized it can artificially generate additional move instructions.

=== Components of register allocation ===
Register allocation consists therefore of choosing where to store the variables at runtime, i.e. inside or outside registers. If the variable is to be stored in registers, then the allocator needs to determine in which register(s) this variable will be stored. Eventually, another challenge is to determine the duration for which a variable should stay at the same location.

A register allocator, disregarding the chosen allocation strategy, can rely on a set of core actions to address these challenges. These actions can be gathered in several different categories:

Move insertion
This action consists of increasing the number of move instructions between registers, i.e. make a variable live in different registers during its lifetime, instead of one. This occurs in the split live range approach.
Spilling
This action consists of storing a variable into memory (primary storage like RAM) instead of registers.
Assignment
This action consists of assigning a register to a variable.
Coalescing
This action consists of limiting the number of moves between registers, thus limiting the total number of instructions. For instance, by identifying a variable live across different methods, and storing it into one register during its whole lifetime.

Many register allocation approaches optimize for one or more specific categories of actions.

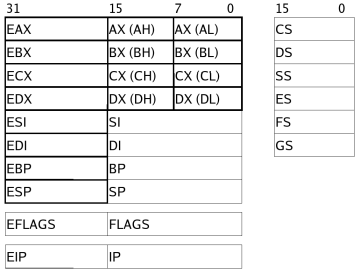
Intel 386 registers

=== Common problems raised in register allocation ===
Register allocation raises several problems that can be tackled (or avoided) by different register allocation approaches. Three of the most common problems are identified as follows:

Aliasing
In some architectures, assigning a value to one register can affect the value of another: this is called aliasing. For example, the x86 architecture has four general purpose 32-bit registers that can also be used as 16-bit or 8-bit registers. In this case, assigning a 32-bit value to the eax register will affect the value of the al register.

Pre-coloring
This problem is an act to force some variables to be assigned to particular registers. For example, in PowerPC calling conventions, parameters are commonly passed in R3-R10 and the return value is passed in R3.

NP-Problem
Chaitin et al. showed that optimal register allocation is an NP-complete problem. This NP-completeness is entirely dependent upon exactly how the problem is structured. It has been shown that for programs in SSA form, the graph coloring portion of the register allocation problem can be solved in linear time. What causes the general graph coloring problem to be NP-complete and what causes some versions of the register allocation problem to be NP-complete are distinct.

== Register allocation techniques ==
Register allocation can happen over a basic block of code: it is said to be "local", and was first mentioned by Horwitz et al. As basic blocks do not contain branches, the allocation process is thought to be fast, because the management of control-flow graph merge points in register allocation reveals itself a time-consuming operation. However, this approach is thought not to produce as optimized code as the "global" approach, which operates over the whole compilation unit (a method or procedure for instance).

=== Graph-coloring allocation ===
Graph-coloring allocation is the predominant approach to solve register allocation. It was first proposed by Chaitin et al. In this approach, nodes in the graph represent live ranges (variables, temporaries, virtual/symbolic registers) that are candidates for register allocation. Edges connect live ranges that interfere, i.e., live ranges that are simultaneously live at at least one program point. Register allocation then reduces to the graph coloring problem in which colors (registers) are assigned to the nodes such that two nodes connected by an edge do not receive the same color.

Using liveness analysis, an interference graph can be built. The interference graph, which is an Interval graph where the nodes are the program's variables, is used to model which variables cannot be allocated to the same register.

==== Principle ====
The main phases in a Chaitin-style graph-coloring register allocator are:

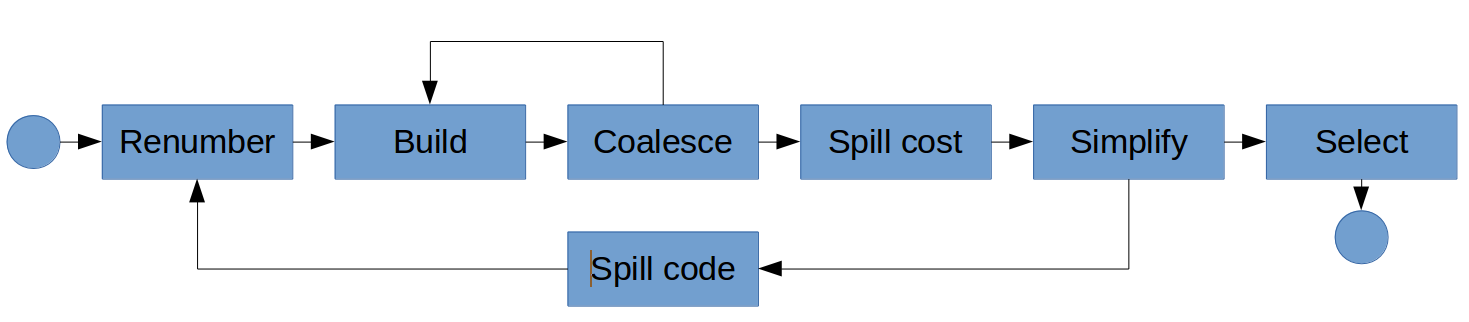
Chaitin et al.'s iterative graph coloring based register allocator

1. Renumber: discover live range information in the source program.
2. Build: build the interference graph.
3. Coalesce: merge the live ranges of non-interfering variables related by copy instructions.
4. Spill cost: compute the spill cost of each variable. This assesses the impact of mapping a variable to memory on the speed of the final program.
5. Simplify: construct an ordering of the nodes in the inferences graph
6. Spill Code: insert spill instructions, i.e. loads and stores to commute values between registers and memory.
7. Select: assign a register to each variable.

The Simplify step is particularly important. Let the number of available registers be $r$. The simplify step notices that a node of degree strictly less than $r$ can always be colored, no matter the coloring of its neighbours. Therefore, the simplify step iteratively removes variables of degree less than $r$. When none remain, a variable is chosen to be removed (making it a spill candidate) and hopefully increasing the number of variables with degree less than $r$.

==== Drawbacks and further improvements ====
The graph-coloring allocation has three major drawbacks. First, it relies on graph-coloring, which is an NP-complete problem, to decide which variables are spilled. Although finding a minimal coloring for general graphs is indeed an NP-complete problem, minimal coloring of Interval graphs (including interference graphs) can be done in linear time (see Linear scan below); Therefore, this technique does not full utilize the problem's assumptions. Second, unless live-range splitting is used, evicted variables are spilled everywhere: store instructions are inserted as early as possible, i.e., just after variable definitions; load instructions are respectively inserted late, just before variable use. Third, a variable that is not spilled is kept in the same register throughout its whole lifetime.

On the other hand, a single register name may appear in multiple register classes, where a class is a set of register names that are interchangeable in a particular role. Then, multiple register names may be aliases for a single hardware register. Finally, graph coloring is an aggressive technique for allocating registers, but is computationally expensive due to its use of the interference graph, which can have a worst-case size that is quadratic in the number of live ranges. The traditional formulation of graph-coloring register allocation implicitly assumes a single bank of non-overlapping general-purpose registers and does not handle irregular architectural features like overlapping registers pairs, special purpose registers and multiple register banks.

One later improvement of Chaitin-style graph-coloring approach was found by Briggs et al.: it is called conservative coalescing. This improvement adds a criterion to decide when two live ranges can be merged. Mainly, in addition to the non-interfering requirements, two variables can only be coalesced if their merging will not cause further spilling. Briggs et al. introduces a second improvement to Chaitin's works which is biased coloring. Biased coloring tries to assign the same color in the graph-coloring to live range that are copy related.

=== Partitioned Boolean Quadratic Programming ===
The traditional formulation of graph coloring register allocation is best applied to orthogonal instruction set. Modern processors use highly non-orthogonal ISAs such as x86-64 or ARM, causing poor performance when using Chaitin-Briggs style register allocation. In response to this problem, Partitioned Boolean Quadratic Programming (PBQP) was developed. PBQP attempts to unify constraints imposed by non-orthogonal architectures under a unified representation, finding better allocations for non-orthogonal architectures. The major drawbacks of PBQP are its inability to cleanly encode live-range splitting, as well as its running time: Like Chaitin-Briggs allocation, it uses a graph which is worst-case quadratic in the number of virtual registers, and is also NP-hard in general.

==== Formulation ====
Similar to graph coloring register allocation, PBQP uses a graph to represent the input problem. It then associates cost matrices with every edge in the graph and cost vectors with every vertex in the graph. Assuming that $r$ registers are available in the ISA, the cost matrices $C_{ij}$ have dimension $(r+1)\times (r+1)$ (in practice different variables have different register domains, but we keep this assumption for simplicity) where $C_{ij}[n][m]$ represents the marginal cost of allocating virtual register $i$ to allocation option $n$ and virtual register $j$ to allocation option $m$. The cost vectors $c$ have size $r+1$, where $c_i[n]$ represents the cost of allocating virtual register $i$ to allocation option $n$. Note the $r+1$ dimension, which is due to the option of spilling. Together, these two cost representations are used to encode the constraints/costs imposed by a non-orthogonal ISA. Some examples of how to encode non-orthogonality using this representation follow:

===== Interference =====
Just like graph-coloring, PBQP also needs to disallow coloring two interfering virtual registers with the same, or overlapping, allocation options. ie if we take two virtual registers $i$,$j$ which interfere, then $C_{ij}[a][b]=+\infty$, where $a$ and $b$ are the same register, or $a$ and $b$ are overlapping registers.

===== Class Constraints =====
Certain virtual registers may only be colorable with certain allocation options. For example, a 32-bit virtual register cannot go in r8b. This is accomplished by setting $c_i[n]=+\infty$, where $n$ is an offending allocation option.

===== Copy Coalescing =====
Let $i$,$j$ be two registers which have a mov instruction from one to the other. In this situation, it may be desirable to assign $i$ and $j$ to the same allocation option so that the move instruction can be elided. In this case $C_{ij}[a][a]=k,a\neq sp$ where $k$ is some negative number determined by the loop nesting, and number of mov instructions between $i$ and $j$.

===== Special Purpose Registers =====
Let $i$ be a virtual register. For ISA-specific reasons, it may be required to color $i$ with a specific allocation option (For example, $i$ may be used as a function parameter, function return value, or the rax argument to x64's single-operand IMUL instruction). Then we can set $c_i[m]=+\infty,m\neq n$ to require this allocation. A similar procedure can be followed when given allocations for $i$ are merely desirable.

All of the above factors should be summed into a single cost matrix for each edge, and a single cost vector for each vertex.

==== Solving PBQP Problems ====
Just like graph-coloring based allocation, PBQP solvers rely on the fact that in practice, many real programs generate PBQP graphs with low degree vertices. PBQP applies reduction rules to these low-degree vertices, removing them from the graph. This creates a cascading effect where previously high-degree vertices have their neighbours removed, and their degree decreased, resulting in them also being removed from the graph. If no low-degree vertices remain, PBQP solvers can apply heuristics to remove vertices. After many such reductions, every vertex will be disconnected, and the PBQP problem becomes trivial. The greedy solution is then selected, and the solution for the full problem can be reconstructed from the solution to the trivially reduced one. The description of the reduction rules and heuristics follows:

===== Degree-1 Reduction (RI) =====
Degree-1 reduction is applied to vertices which have exactly 1 outgoing edge. Take a vertex $i$ which has a single neighbour $j$. Notice that for a given allocation of virtual register $j$ to allocation option $n$, the optimal allocation of $i$ can be found via the following expression: $m=\text{argmin}_h(C_{ij}[h][n]+c_i[h])$. The procedure for Degree-1 reduction is then: loop over each possible choice of $n$. Update $c_j[n] = c_j[n]+C_{ij}[m][n]+c_i[m]$. Delete vertex $i$ and its edge to vertex $j$. Push vertex $i$ onto the stack for later reconstruction of the solution.

===== Degree-2 Reduction (RII) =====
This reduction applies to vertices with a degree of exactly two. Take a vertex $i$ with neighbours $j$ and $k$. Notice that for a given allocation of virtual registers $j$ and $k$ to allocation options $n$ and $m$ respectively, there is an optimal allocation for $i$ given by $p=\text{argmin}_h(C_{ij}[h][n]+C_{ik}[h][m]+c_i[h])$. Degree-2 reduction is then performed by: Create a new edge between vertices $j$ and $k$ if it does not exist already. The new edge should have a cost matrix consisting of all 0 entries. loop over each of $(r+1)^2$ combinations of allocations to $j$ and $k$. Set $C_{jk}[n][m]=C_{jk}[n][m]+C_{ij}[p][n]+C_{ik}[p][m]+c_i[p]$. Delete vertex $i$. Delete the edges from vertex $i$ to vertices $j$ and $k$. Push vertex $i$ onto the stack for later reconstruction.

===== Degree-$n$ Reduction (RN) =====
Lastly, if no vertices of degree one or two remain, then degree-$n$ reduction must be used. This reduction relies on heuristics, and breaks the optimality guarantee. In Degree-$n$ reduction, a vertex is chosen, and a heuristic is used to make a preliminary allocation for that vertex. This preliminary allocation is then used (with some further modifications) to update the cost vectors of adjacent vertices. Finally, the selected vertex is deleted along with its edges, and pushed on the stack. The heuristics used for ordering of RN reduction, and modification of cost have a significant effect on the resulting allocation.

An example set of heuristics is presented: First, the vertex $i$ with minimum spill cost/degree ratio is chosen to be reduced. Second, we estimate the cost for a given allocation option n of virtual register $i$ by assuming that we can optimally choose the cost of adjacent vertices. ie define $c[g]=c_i[g]+\sum_{j\in adj(i)}\text{min}_h(C_{ij}[g][h]+c_j[h])$. Because this is a preliminary selection, we do not want our allocation of $i$ to overconstrain neighbours, so we set relevant $c[h]=+\infty$ and select $n=\text{argmin}_h(c[h])$. Next, for a given $j\in adj(i)$ define a modified
$$C_j[h] = \begin{cases} \frac{c_i[sp]}{\deg(i)} &
\text{if } C_{ij}[n][h] = +\infty,\\ C_{ij}[n][h] & \text{otherwise}.
\end{cases}$$
and update $c_j=c_j+C_j$. The intention of this modification is again to ensure that our preliminary choices for $i$ do not overconstrain adjacent vertices.

===== Reconstruction =====
After the PBQP problem has been reduced such that all vertices are of trivial degree, the solution can be reconstructed. First, allocate every remaining vertex $i$ to allocation option $n=\text{argmin}_h(c_i[h])$. Finally, iteratively pop vertices off the stack constructed during reduction. At each step, add the vertex back to the graph, along with its edges, and make a greedy choice for the new vertex's allocation. This greedy allocation uses the same method as outlined in the reduction rules above.

===== Branch and Bound =====
Even in the presence of tuned RN heuristics, it is useful to have a method which obtains optimal allocations on PBQP problems where RN reduction is required. To solve this problem, notice that the general optimization technique of Branch and bound can be applied to PBQP. Sub-problems of a PBQP are non-trivial subgraphs produced after only RI and RII reductions have been applied. The $r+1$ children of a subproblem represent the problems obtained after choosing a vertex $i$ to branch on, making $r+1$ different allocations to $i$, and reducing the resulting problems. To find lower and upper bounds for a PBQP problem, note that exactly one element from each cost vector and cost matrix can contribute to the problem's final cost. Therefore, the upper bound $f_u=\sum_{i}(\text{max}_n(c_i[n])+\sum_{j<i}\text{max}_{nm}(C_{ij}[n][m]))$. The lower bound is defined similarly. After this, the normal branch-and-bound procedure can be followed: Initialize a global upper bound to $+\infty$, and a priority queue of subproblems keyed on lower bound initially containing the reduced input problem. Iteratively dequeue the node with the smallest lower bound, compute its children (along with their bounds), update the global upper bound and current solution (if any of the children are trivial), insert the non-trivial children, and continue. If the dequeued node has a lower bound exceeding the upper bound, or if the queue is empty, then the algorithm can be terminated.

=== Linear scan ===
Linear scan is another global register allocation approach. It was first proposed by Poletto et al. in 1999. In this approach, the code is not turned into a graph. Instead, all the variables are linearly scanned to determine their live range, represented as an interval. Once the live ranges of all variables have been figured out, the intervals are traversed chronologically. Although this traversal could help identifying variables whose live ranges interfere, no interference graph is being built and the variables are allocated in a greedy way.

The motivation for this approach is speed; not in terms of execution time of the generated code, but in terms of time spent in code generation. Typically, the standard graph coloring approaches produce quality code, but have a significant overhead, the used graph coloring algorithm having a quadratic cost. Owing to this feature, linear scan is the approach currently used in several JIT compilers, like the Hotspot client compiler, V8, Jikes RVM, and the Android Runtime (ART). The Hotspot server compiler uses graph coloring for its superior code.

==== Pseudocode ====
This describes the algorithm as first proposed by Poletto et al., where:

- R is the number of available registers.
- active is the list, sorted in order of increasing end point, of live intervals overlapping the current point and placed in registers.

LinearScanRegisterAllocation
    active ← {}
    for each live interval i, in order of increasing start point do
        ExpireOldIntervals(i)
        if length(active) = R then
            SpillAtInterval(i)
        else
            register[i] ← a register removed from pool of free registers
            add i to active, sorted by increasing end point

ExpireOldIntervals(i)
    for each interval j in active, in order of increasing end point do
        if endpoint[j] ≥ startpoint[i] then
            return 
        remove j from active
        add register[j] to pool of free registers

SpillAtInterval(i)
    spill ← last interval in active
    if endpoint[spill] > endpoint[i] then
        register[i] ← register[spill]
        location[spill] ← new stack location
        remove spill from active
        add i to active, sorted by increasing end point
    else
        location[i] ← new stack location

==== Drawbacks and further improvements ====
However, the linear scan presents two major drawbacks. First, due to its greedy aspect, it does not take lifetime holes into account, i.e. "ranges where the value of the variable is not needed". Besides, a spilled variable will stay spilled for its entire lifetime.

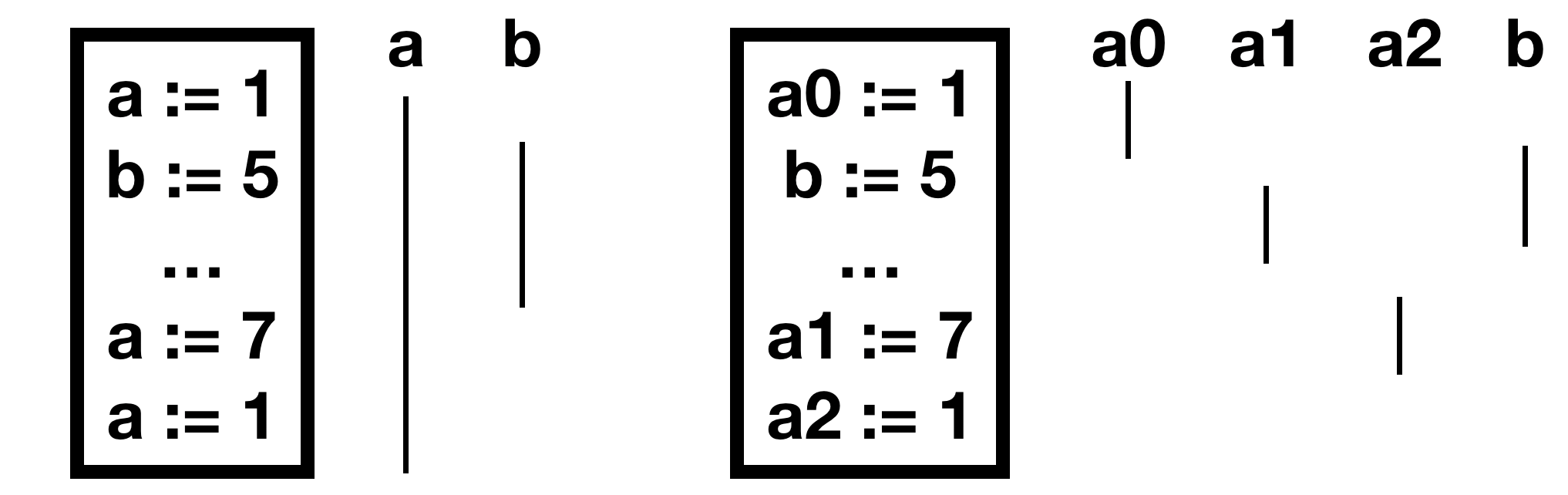
Shorter live ranges with SSA approach

Many other research works followed up on the Poletto's linear scan algorithm. Traub et al., for instance, proposed an algorithm called second-chance binpacking aiming at generating code of better quality. In this approach, spilled variables get the opportunity to be stored later in a register by using a different heuristic from the one used in the standard linear scan algorithm. Instead of using live intervals, the algorithm relies on live ranges, meaning that if a range needs to be spilled, it is not necessary to spill all the other ranges corresponding to this variable.

Linear scan allocation was also adapted to take advantage from the SSA form: the properties of this intermediate representation simplify the allocation algorithm and allow lifetime holes to be computed directly. First, the time spent in data-flow graph analysis, aimed at building the lifetime intervals, is reduced, namely because variables are unique. It consequently produces shorter live intervals, because each new assignment corresponds to a new live interval. To avoid modeling intervals and liveness holes, Rogers showed a simplification called future-active sets that successfully removed intervals for 80% of instructions.

=== Coalescing ===
In the context of register allocation, coalescing is the act of merging variable-to-variable move operations by allocating those two variables to the same location. The coalescing operation takes place after the interference graph is built. Once two nodes have been coalesced, they must get the same color and be allocated to the same register, once the copy operation becomes unnecessary.

Doing coalescing might have both positive and negative impacts on the colorability of the interference graph. For example, one negative impact that coalescing could have on graph inference colorability is when two nodes are coalesced, as the result node will have a union of the edges of those being coalesced. A positive impact of coalescing on inference graph colorability is, for example, when a node interferes with both nodes being coalesced, the degree of the node is reduced by one which leads to improving the overall colorability of the interference graph.

There are several coalescing heuristics available:

Aggressive coalescing
It was first introduced in Chaitin's original register allocator. This heuristic aims at coalescing any non-interfering, copy-related nodes. From the perspective of copy elimination, this heuristic has the best results. On the other hand, aggressive coalescing could impact the colorability of the inference graph.
Conservative Coalescing
It mainly uses the same heuristic as aggressive coalescing but it merges moves if, and only if, it does not compromise the colorability of the interference graph.
Iterated coalescing
It removes one particular move at the time, while keeping the colorability of the graph.
Optimistic coalescing
It is based on aggressive coalescing, but if the inference graph colorability is compromised, then it gives up as few moves as possible.

=== Mixed approaches ===
==== Hybrid allocation ====
Some other register allocation approaches do not limit to one technique to optimize register's use. Cavazos et al., for instance, proposed a solution where it is possible to use both the linear scan and the graph coloring algorithms. In this approach, the choice between one or the other solution is determined dynamically: first, a machine learning algorithm is used "offline", that is to say not at runtime, to build a heuristic function that determines which allocation algorithm needs to be used. The heuristic function is then used at runtime; in light of the code behavior, the allocator can then choose between one of the two available algorithms.

Trace register allocation is a recent approach developed by Eisl et al. This technique handles the allocation locally: it relies on dynamic profiling data to determine which branches will be the most frequently used in a given control flow graph. It then infers a set of "traces" (i.e. code segments) in which the merge point is ignored in favor of the most used branch. Each trace is then independently processed by the allocator. This approach can be considered as hybrid because it is possible to use different register allocation algorithms between the different traces.

==== Split allocation ====
Split allocation is another register allocation technique that combines different approaches, usually considered as opposite. For instance, the hybrid allocation technique can be considered as split because the first heuristic building stage is performed offline, and the heuristic use is performed online. In the same fashion, B. Diouf et al. proposed an allocation technique relying both on offline and online behaviors, namely static and dynamic compilation. During the offline stage, an optimal spill set is first gathered using Integer Linear Programming. Then, live ranges are annotated using the compressAnnotation algorithm which relies on the previously identified optimal spill set. Register allocation is performed afterwards during the online stage, based on the data collected in the offline phase.

In 2007, Bouchez et al. suggested as well to split the register allocation in different stages, having one stage dedicated to spilling, and one dedicated to coloring and coalescing.

== Comparison between the different techniques ==
Several metrics have been used to assess the performance of one register allocation technique against the other. Register allocation has typically to deal with a trade-off between code quality, i.e. code that executes quickly, and analysis overhead, i.e. the time spent determining analyzing the source code to generate code with optimized register allocation. From this perspective, execution time of the generated code and time spent in liveness analysis are relevant metrics to compare the different techniques.

Once relevant metrics have been chosen, the code on which the metrics will be applied should be available and relevant to the problem, either by reflecting the behavior of real-world application, or by being relevant to the particular problem the algorithm wants to address. The more recent articles about register allocation uses especially the Dacapo benchmark suite.

== See also ==
- Strahler number, the minimum number of registers needed to evaluate an expression tree.
- Register (keyword), the hint in C and C++ for a variable to be placed in a register.
- Sethi–Ullman algorithm, an algorithm to produce the most efficient register allocation for evaluating a single expression when the number of registers required to evaluate the expression exceeds the number of available registers.

== Sources ==
- Ahn, Minwook; Paek, Yunheung (2009). "Register coalescing techniques for heterogeneous register architecture with copy sifting". ACM Transactions on Embedded Computing Systems. 8 (2): 1–37. CiteSeerX 10.1.1.615.5767. doi:10.1145/1457255.1457263. ISSN 1539-9087. S2CID 14143277.
- Aho, Alfred V.; Lam, Monica S.; Sethi, Ravi; Ullman, Jeffrey D. (2006). Compilers: Principles, Techniques, and Tools (second ed.). Addison-Wesley Longman Publishing Co., Inc. ISBN 978-0321486813.
- Appel, Andrew W.; George, Lal (2001). "Optimal spilling for CISC machines with few registers". Proceedings of the ACM SIGPLAN 2001 conference on Programming language design and implementation - PLDI '01. pp. 243–253. CiteSeerX 10.1.1.37.8978. doi:10.1145/378795.378854. ISBN 978-1581134148. S2CID 1380545.
- Barik, Rajkishore; Grothoff, Christian; Gupta, Rahul; Pandit, Vinayaka; Udupa, Raghavendra (2007). "Optimal Bitwise Register Allocation Using Integer Linear Programming". Languages and Compilers for Parallel Computing. Lecture Notes in Computer Science. Vol. 4382. pp. 267–282. CiteSeerX 10.1.1.75.6911. doi:10.1007/978-3-540-72521-3_20. ISBN 978-3-540-72520-6.
- Bergner, Peter; Dahl, Peter; Engebretsen, David; O'Keefe, Matthew (1997). "Spill code minimization via interference region spilling". Proceedings of the ACM SIGPLAN 1997 conference on Programming language design and implementation - PLDI '97. pp. 287–295. doi:10.1145/258915.258941. ISBN 978-0897919074. S2CID 16952747.
- Blackburn, Stephen M.; Guyer, Samuel Z.; Hirzel, Martin; Hosking, Antony; Jump, Maria; Lee, Han; Eliot, J.; Moss, B.; Phansalkar, Aashish; Stefanović, Darko; VanDrunen, Thomas; Garner, Robin; von Dincklage, Daniel; Wiedermann, Ben; Hoffmann, Chris; Khang, Asjad M.; McKinley, Kathryn S.; Bentzur, Rotem; Diwan, Amer; Feinberg, Daniel; Frampton, Daniel (2006). "The DaCapo benchmarks". Proceedings of the 21st annual ACM SIGPLAN conference on Object-oriented programming systems, languages, and applications - OOPSLA '06. p. 169. doi:10.1145/1167473.1167488. hdl:1885/33723. ISBN 978-1595933485. S2CID 9255051.
- Book, Ronald V. (December 1975). "Karp Richard M.. Reducibility among combinatorial problems. Complexity of computer computations, Proceedings of a Symposium on the Complexity of Computer Computations, held March 20-22, 1972, at the IBM Thomas J. Watson Center, Yorktown Heights, New York, edited by Miller Raymond E. and Thatcher James W., Plenum Press, New York and London 1972, pp. 85–103". The Journal of Symbolic Logic. 40 (4): 618–619. doi:10.2307/2271828. ISSN 0022-4812. JSTOR 2271828.
- Bouchez, Florent; Darte, Alain; Rastello, Fabrice (2006). "Register Allocation: What Does the NP-Completeness Proof of Chaitin et al. Really Prove? Or Revisiting Register Allocation: Why and How". Register allocation: what does the NP-Completeness proof of Chaitin et al. really prove?. Lecture Notes in Computer Science. Vol. 4382. pp. 2–14. doi:10.1007/978-3-540-72521-3_21. ISBN 978-3-540-72520-6.
- Bouchez, Florent; Darte, Alain; Rastello, Fabrice (2007a). "On the Complexity of Register Coalescing". International Symposium on Code Generation and Optimization (CGO'07). pp. 102–114. CiteSeerX 10.1.1.101.6801. doi:10.1109/CGO.2007.26. ISBN 978-0-7695-2764-2. S2CID 7683867.
- Bouchez, Florent; Darte, Alain; Rastello, Fabrice (2007b). "On the complexity of spill everywhere under SSA form". ACM SIGPLAN Notices. 42 (7): 103–114. arXiv:0710.3642. doi:10.1145/1273444.1254782. ISSN 0362-1340.
- Braun, Matthias; Hack, Sebastian (2009). "Register Spilling and Live-Range Splitting for SSA-Form Programs". Compiler Construction. Lecture Notes in Computer Science. Vol. 5501. pp. 174–189. CiteSeerX 10.1.1.219.5318. doi:10.1007/978-3-642-00722-4_13. ISBN 978-3-642-00721-7. ISSN 0302-9743.
- Briggs, Preston; Cooper, Keith D.; Torczon, Linda (1992). "Rematerialization". ACM SIGPLAN Notices. 27 (7): 311–321. doi:10.1145/143103.143143. ISSN 0362-1340.
- Briggs, Preston; Cooper, Keith D.; Torczon, Linda (1994). "Improvements to graph coloring register allocation". ACM Transactions on Programming Languages and Systems. 16 (3): 428–455. CiteSeerX 10.1.1.23.253. doi:10.1145/177492.177575. ISSN 0164-0925. S2CID 6571479.
- Cavazos, John; Moss, J. Eliot B.; O’Boyle, Michael F. P. (2006). "Hybrid Optimizations: Which Optimization Algorithm to Use?". Compiler Construction. Lecture Notes in Computer Science. Vol. 3923. pp. 124–138. doi:10.1007/11688839_12. ISBN 978-3-540-33050-9. ISSN 0302-9743.
- Chaitin, Gregory J.; Auslander, Marc A.; Chandra, Ashok K.; Cocke, John; Hopkins, Martin E.; Markstein, Peter W. (1981). "Register allocation via coloring". Computer Languages. 6 (1): 47–57. doi:10.1016/0096-0551(81)90048-5. ISSN 0096-0551.
- Chaitin, G. J. (1982). "Register allocation & spilling via graph coloring". Proceedings of the 1982 SIGPLAN symposium on Compiler construction - SIGPLAN '82. pp. 98–101. doi:10.1145/800230.806984. ISBN 978-0897910743. S2CID 16872867.
- Chen, Wei-Yu; Lueh, Guei-Yuan; Ashar, Pratik; Chen, Kaiyu; Cheng, Buqi (2018). "Register allocation for Intel processor graphics". Proceedings of the 2018 International Symposium on Code Generation and Optimization - CGO 2018. pp. 352–364. doi:10.1145/3168806. ISBN 9781450356176. S2CID 3367270.
- Cohen, Albert; Rohou, Erven (2010). "Processor virtualization and split compilation for heterogeneous multicore embedded systems". Proceedings of the 47th Design Automation Conference on - DAC '10. p. 102. CiteSeerX 10.1.1.470.9701. doi:10.1145/1837274.1837303. ISBN 9781450300025. S2CID 14314078.
- Colombet, Quentin; Brandner, Florian; Darte, Alain (2011). "Studying optimal spilling in the light of SSA". Proceedings of the 14th international conference on Compilers, architectures and synthesis for embedded systems - CASES '11. p. 25. doi:10.1145/2038698.2038706. ISBN 9781450307130. S2CID 8296742.
- Diouf, Boubacar; Cohen, Albert; Rastello, Fabrice; Cavazos, John (2010). "Split Register Allocation: Linear Complexity Without the Performance Penalty". High Performance Embedded Architectures and Compilers. Lecture Notes in Computer Science. Vol. 5952. pp. 66–80. CiteSeerX 10.1.1.229.3988. doi:10.1007/978-3-642-11515-8_7. ISBN 978-3-642-11514-1. ISSN 0302-9743.
- Ditzel, David R.; McLellan, H. R. (1982). "Register allocation for free". Proceedings of the first international symposium on Architectural support for programming languages and operating systems - ASPLOS-I. pp. 48–56. doi:10.1145/800050.801825. ISBN 978-0897910668. S2CID 2812379.
- Eisl, Josef; Grimmer, Matthias; Simon, Doug; Würthinger, Thomas; Mössenböck, Hanspeter (2016). "Trace-based Register Allocation in a JIT Compiler". Proceedings of the 13th International Conference on Principles and Practices of Programming on the Java Platform: Virtual Machines, Languages, and Tools - PPPJ '16. pp. 1–11. doi:10.1145/2972206.2972211. ISBN 9781450341356. S2CID 31845919.
- Eisl, Josef; Marr, Stefan; Würthinger, Thomas; Mössenböck, Hanspeter (2017). "Trace Register Allocation Policies" (PDF). Proceedings of the 14th International Conference on Managed Languages and Runtimes - Man Lang 2017. pp. 92–104. doi:10.1145/3132190.3132209. ISBN 9781450353403. S2CID 1195601.
- Eisl, Josef; Leopoldseder, David; Mössenböck, Hanspeter (2018). "Parallel trace register allocation". Proceedings of the 15th International Conference on Managed Languages & Runtimes - Man Lang '18. pp. 1–7. doi:10.1145/3237009.3237010. ISBN 9781450364249. S2CID 52137887.
- Koes, David Ryan; Goldstein, Seth Copen (2009). "Register Allocation Deconstructed". Written at Nice, France. Proceedings of the 12th International Workshop on Software and Compilers for Embedded Systems. SCOPES '09. New York, NY, USA: ACM. pp. 21–30. ISBN 978-1-60558-696-0.
- Farach, Martin; Liberatore, Vincenzo (1998). "On Local Register Allocation". Written at San Francisco, California, USA. Proceedings of the Ninth Annual ACM-SIAM Symposium on Discrete Algorithms. SODA '98. Philadelphia, PA, USA: Society for Industrial and Applied Mathematics. pp. 564–573. ISBN 0-89871-410-9.
- Flajolet, P.; Raoult, J. C.; Vuillemin, J. (1979), "The number of registers required for evaluating arithmetic expressions", Theoretical Computer Science, 9 (1): 99–125, doi:10.1016/0304-3975(79)90009-4
- George, Lal; Appel, Andrew W. (1996). "Iterated register coalescing". ACM Transactions on Programming Languages and Systems. 18 (3): 300–324. doi:10.1145/229542.229546. ISSN 0164-0925. S2CID 12281734.
- Horwitz, L. P.; Karp, R. M.; Miller, R. E.; Winograd, S. (1966). "Index Register Allocation". Journal of the ACM. 13 (1): 43–61. doi:10.1145/321312.321317. ISSN 0004-5411. S2CID 14560597.
- Johansson, Erik; Sagonas, Konstantinos (2002). "Linear Scan Register Allocation in a High-Performance Erlang Compiler". Practical Aspects of Declarative Languages. Lecture Notes in Computer Science. Vol. 2257. pp. 101–119. doi:10.1007/3-540-45587-6_8. ISBN 978-3-540-43092-6. ISSN 0302-9743.
- Kurdahi, F. J.; Parker, A. C. (1987). "REAL: a program for REgister ALlocation". 24th ACM/IEEE conference proceedings on Design automation conference - DAC '87. pp. 210–215. doi:10.1145/37888.37920. ISBN 978-0818607813. S2CID 17598675.
- Mössenböck, Hanspeter; Pfeiffer, Michael (2002). "Linear Scan Register Allocation in the Context of SSA Form and Register Constraints". Compiler Construction. Lecture Notes in Computer Science. Vol. 2304. pp. 229–246. doi:10.1007/3-540-45937-5_17. ISBN 978-3-540-43369-9. ISSN 0302-9743.
- Nickerson, Brian R. (1990). "Graph coloring register allocation for processors with multi-register operands". ACM SIGPLAN Notices. 25 (6): 40–52. doi:10.1145/93548.93552. ISSN 0362-1340.
- Paleczny, Michael; Vick, Christopher; Click, Cliff (2001). "The Java HotSpot Server Compiler". Proceedings of the Java Virtual Machine Research and Technology Symposium (JVM01). Monterey, California, USA. pp. 1–12. CiteSeerX 10.1.1.106.1919.
- Park, Jinpyo; Moon, Soo-Mook (2004). "Optimistic register coalescing". ACM Transactions on Programming Languages and Systems. 26 (4): 735–765. CiteSeerX 10.1.1.33.9438. doi:10.1145/1011508.1011512. ISSN 0164-0925. S2CID 15969885.
- Poletto, Massimiliano; Sarkar, Vivek (1999). "Linear scan register allocation". ACM Transactions on Programming Languages and Systems. 21 (5): 895–913. CiteSeerX 10.1.1.27.2462. doi:10.1145/330249.330250. ISSN 0164-0925. S2CID 18180752.
- Rogers, Ian (2020). "Efficient global register allocation". arXiv:2011.05608 [cs.PL].
- Runeson, Johan; Nyström, Sven-Olof (2003). "Retargetable Graph-Coloring Register Allocation for Irregular Architectures". Software and Compilers for Embedded Systems. Lecture Notes in Computer Science. Vol. 2826. pp. 240–254. CiteSeerX 10.1.1.6.6186. doi:10.1007/978-3-540-39920-9_17. ISBN 978-3-540-20145-8. ISSN 0302-9743.
- Smith, Michael D.; Ramsey, Norman; Holloway, Glenn (2004). "A generalized algorithm for graph-coloring register allocation". ACM SIGPLAN Notices. 39 (6): 277. CiteSeerX 10.1.1.71.9532. doi:10.1145/996893.996875. ISSN 0362-1340.
- Traub, Omri; Holloway, Glenn; Smith, Michael D. (1998). "Quality and speed in linear-scan register allocation". ACM SIGPLAN Notices. 33 (5): 142–151. CiteSeerX 10.1.1.52.8730. doi:10.1145/277652.277714. ISSN 0362-1340.
- Wimmer, Christian; Mössenböck, Hanspeter (2005). "Optimized interval splitting in a linear scan register allocator". Proceedings of the 1st ACM/USENIX international conference on Virtual execution environments - VEE '05. p. 132. CiteSeerX 10.1.1.394.4054. doi:10.1145/1064979.1064998. ISBN 978-1595930477. S2CID 494490.
- Wimmer, Christian; Franz, Michael (2010). "Linear scan register allocation on SSA form". Proceedings of the 8th annual IEEE/ ACM international symposium on Code generation and optimization - CGO '10. p. 170. CiteSeerX 10.1.1.162.2590. doi:10.1145/1772954.1772979. ISBN 9781605586359. S2CID 1820765.
