= Remi El-Ouazzane =

French businessman (born 1973)

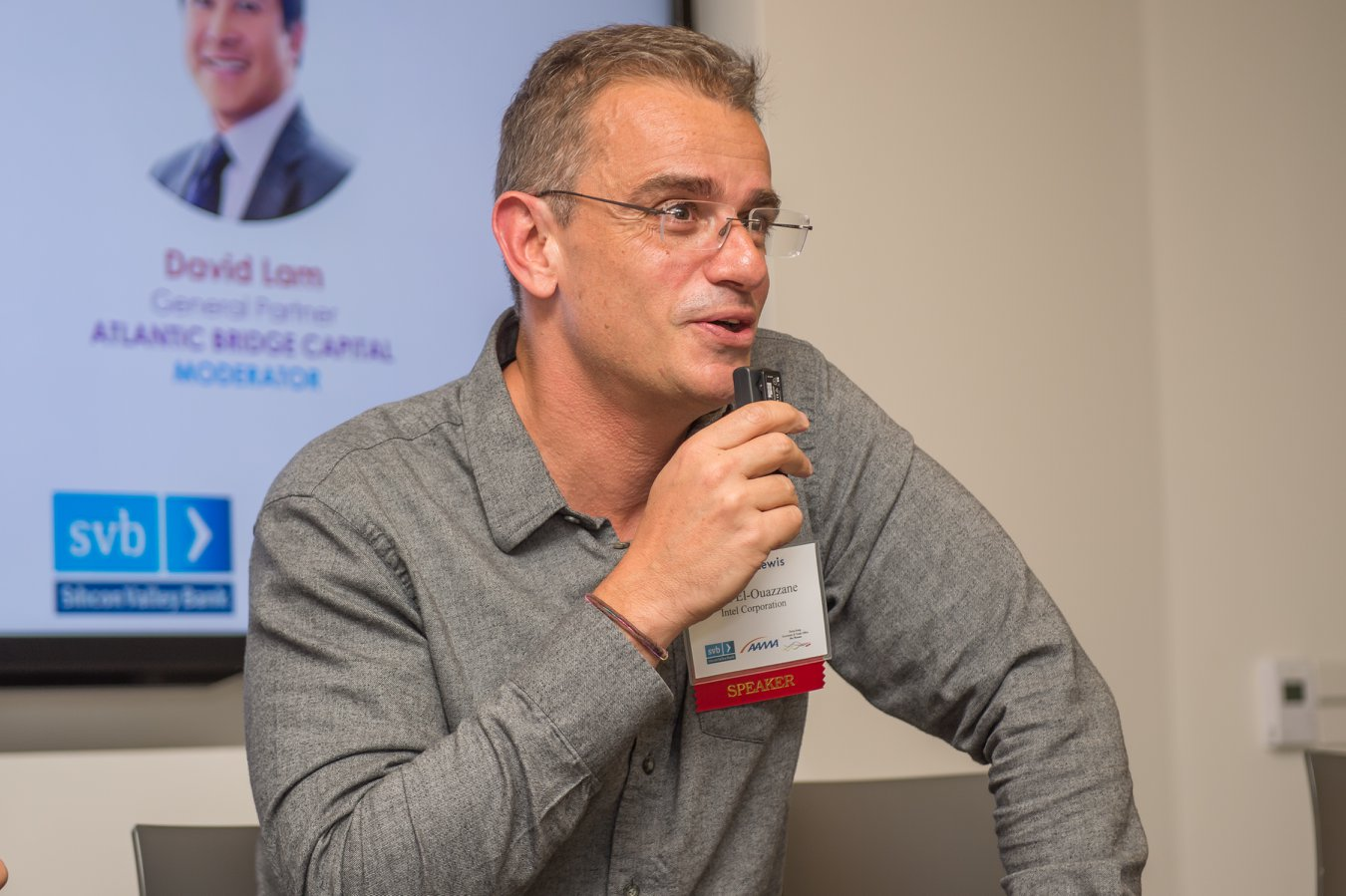
Remi El-Ouazzane interviewed in 2015

Remi El-Ouazzane (born June 4, 1973) is a French businessman and embedded systems engineer who has led various initiatives in mobile computing, machine vision and embedded artificial intelligence. El-Ouazzane is STMicroelectronics (ST) President, Microcontrollers and Digital ICs Group and has held this position since January 1, 2022. He is a member of ST's executive committee.

== Early life and education ==
El-Ouazzane was born in Neuilly-sur-Seine, France on June 4, 1973. He was born to a Tunisian (Tozeur) father and a French (Avallon) mother. El-Ouazzane grew up with three brothers in Épinay-sur-Seine, a suburb of Paris. In 1996, he obtained a master's degree in semiconductor physics engineering from Grenoble Institute of Technology. The following year, El-Ouazzane graduated in economics and finance from the Grenoble Institute of Political Studies. In 2004, he completed Harvard Business School’s General Management (GMP) program. El-Ouazzane lives in Silicon Valley with his wife and two children.

== Career ==
=== Texas Instruments ===
In 1997, El-Ouazzane joined Texas Instruments (TI) as part of the TI Young Leader Program. After graduating from the Young Leaders program, he has served in various business units within Texas Instruments, including the Broadband Communications Group and the Wireless Business Group before becoming the Vice President and Worldwide General Manager of the Open Multimedia Applications Platform (OMAP) Business Unit.

==== Notable achievements at Texas Instruments ====
- 2009: Pioneered the first OMAP application processor for the Android platform and spearheaded the development of the OMAP 4 platform. The OMAP architecture powered many of the first notable Android smartphone devices such as the Motorola Droid line of phones and Galaxy Nexus smartphone co developed with Google and Samsung.
- 2012: Created a partnership with iRobot to develop robotic technologies using TI's OMAP architecture.
- 2012: Spearheaded a deal with global audio and infotainment group Harman to incorporate TI's OMAP 5 processors into premium automotive platforms.

=== Movidius ===
In early 2013, El-Ouazzane accepted the position of chief executive officer of Movidius. After having repositioned the company in the fields of embedded machine vision and artificial intelligence, he has led the company's technology into products from companies like Google, Lenovo and DJI, as well as raising over $40 million in funding to accelerate adoption of Movidius technology.

==== Notable Achievements at Movidius ====
- 2013: Built partnership with Google's Project Tango group.
- 2014: Launched the Myriad 2 Vision Processing Unit (VPU).
- 2015: Raised $40 million in funding to accelerate adoption of Movidius technology.
- 2016: Closed deals with major technology companies including Google, DJI, FLIR Systems, and Lenovo, bringing Movidius technology to mainstream consumer devices.

=== Intel ===
In November 2016, El-Ouazzane joined the New Technology Group at Intel following the acquisition of Movidius, assuming the role of Vice President. In this role, El-Ouazzane was responsible for continuing the engineering development, integration and commercial deployment of Movidius technologies.

In August 2018, El-Ouazzane assumed the role of vice president and chief operating officer of Intel's Artificial Intelligence Products Group (AIPG) where he is responsible for overseeing all engineering efforts in the group, including product management activities.

In January 2020, El-Ouazzane took over the role of Chief Strategy Officer for Intel's Data Platforms Group.

=== STMicroelectronics ===
In January 2022, El-Ouazzane left Intel to join STMicroelectronics as president, Microcontrollers and Digital ICs Group. He is a member of ST's executive committee.

== Awards ==
In 2009, El-Ouazzane was selected as the recipient of the French-American Foundation's Young Leaders Award.
