= Outer loop =

Outer loop can refer to:

- The counterclockwise lanes of travel on an orbital roadway for traffic that drives on the right, or the clockwise lanes of travel for traffic that drives on the left.
  - The outer loop (counter-clockwise roadway) of Interstate 495 (Capital Beltway)
- A beltway that encircles an urban area's "outer" limits or the outermost beltway.
  - The proposed Outer Perimeter around Atlanta, Georgia
  - New York State Route 47, the former designation of the Outer Loop expressway around Rochester, New York
  - Interstate 295 (North Carolina), also known as the Fayetteville Outer Loop
  - Interstate 540 (North Carolina), also known as the Raleigh Outer Loop
- Osaka Outer Loop Line, a tentative name of Osaka Higashi Line, a railway line around Osaka, Japan
- In computer programming, a control flow loop that has another loop nested inside it—see Inner loop
