= Integer set library =

isl
- Developers: Sven Verdoolaege, INRIA and others
- Stable release: 0.27 / September 1, 2024; 20 months ago
- Available in: C
- Type: Mathematical software
- License: MIT
- Website: libisl.sourceforge.io

isl (integer set library) is a portable C library for manipulating sets and relations of integer points bounded by linear constraints.

The following operations are supported:

- intersection, union, set difference
- emptiness check
- convex hull
- (integer) affine hull
- integer projection
- computing the lexicographic minimum using parametric integer programming
- coalescing
- parametric vertex enumeration

It also includes an ILP solver based on generalized basis reduction, transitive closures on maps (which may encode infinite graphs), dependence analysis and bounds on piecewise step-polynomials.

All computations are performed in exact integer arithmetic using GMP or imath.

Many program analysis techniques are based on integer set manipulations. The integers typically represent iterations of a loop nest or elements of an array. isl uses parametric integer programming to obtain an explicit representation in terms of integer divisions.

It is used as backend polyhedral library in the GCC Graphite framework and in the LLVM Polly framework for loop optimizations.

== See also ==
- Frameworks supporting the polyhedral model
- Integer programming
- List of open-source mathematical libraries
