= Zeroth (software) =

Zeroth is a platform for brain-inspired computing from Qualcomm. It is based around a neural processing unit (NPU) AI accelerator chip and a software API to interact with the platform. It makes a form of machine learning known as deep learning available to mobile devices. It is used for image and sound processing, including speech recognition. The software operates locally rather than as a cloud application.

Mobile chip maker Qualcomm announced in March 2015, that it would bundle the software with its next major mobile device chip, the Snapdragon 820 processor.

== Applications ==
Qualcomm demonstrated that the system could recognize human faces and gestures that it had seen before and detect and then search for different types of photo scenes.

Another potential application is to extend battery life by analyzing phone usage and powering down all or part of its capabilities without affecting the user experience.

== See also ==
- Neuromorphic computing
- SpiNNaker
- TrueNorth
- Vision processing unit, a class of processors aimed at machine vision (including convolutional neural networks, hence overlapping with 'neural processing units')
