= Movidius =

American computer processor chip design company

Movidius Ltd.
- Type: Private
- Founded: 2005; 21 years ago
- Defunct: September 2016; 10 years ago
- Fate: Acquired by Intel
- Headquarters: San Mateo, California, U.S.
- Products: Computer vision and deep-learning processor chips
- Owner: Intel
- Website: www.intel.com/content/www/us/en/products/details/processors/movidius-vpu.html

Movidius Ltd. was a company based in San Mateo, California, that designed low-power processor chips for computer vision. The company was acquired by Intel in September 2016, who continues to sell the company's products under the Movidius line.

== Company history ==
Logo of Intel Movidius since 2020

Movidius was co-founded in 2005 by Sean Mitchell, David Moloney, and Val Muresan in Dublin, Ireland. Between 2006 and 2016, it raised nearly $90 million in capital funding. In May 2013, the company appointed Remi El-Ouazzane as CEO. In January 2016, the company announced a partnership with Google. Movidius has been active in Google's Project Tango, and in September 2016 it was announced that Intel planned to acquire the company.

== Products ==
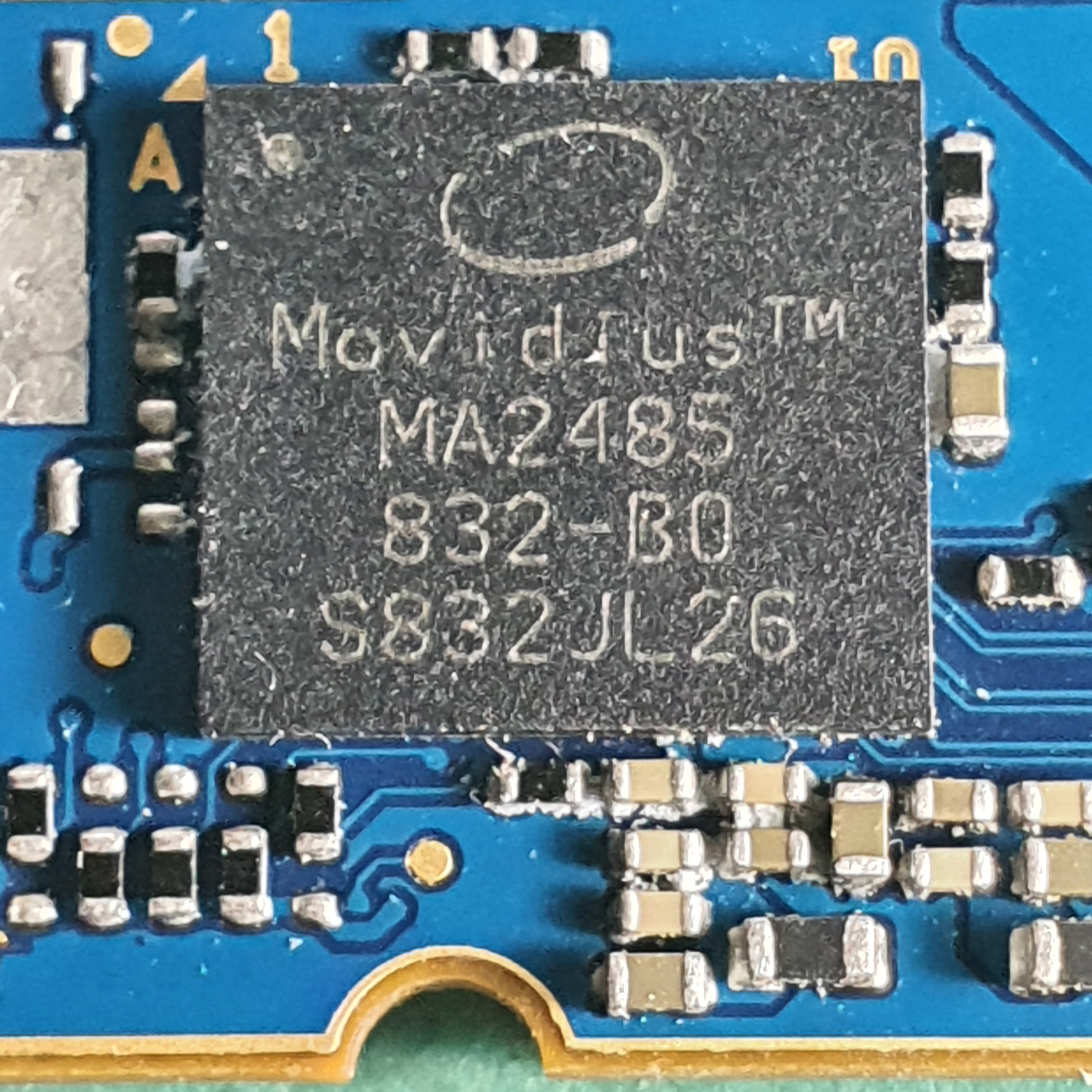
Myriad X chip (MA2485)

=== Myriad 2 ===
The company's Myriad 2 chip is a manycore vision processing unit that can function on power-constrained devices. The Fathom is a USB stick containing a Myriad 2 processor, allowing a vision accelerator to be added to devices using ARM processors including PCs, drones, robots, IoT devices and video surveillance for tasks such as identifying people or objects. It can run at between 80 and 150 GFLOPS on 1W of power.

=== Myriad X ===
Intel's Myriad X VPU (vision processing unit) is the third generation VPU from Movidius. It uses a Neural Compute Engine, a dedicated hardware accelerator—for neural network deep-learning inferences.

== Neural Compute Stick ==
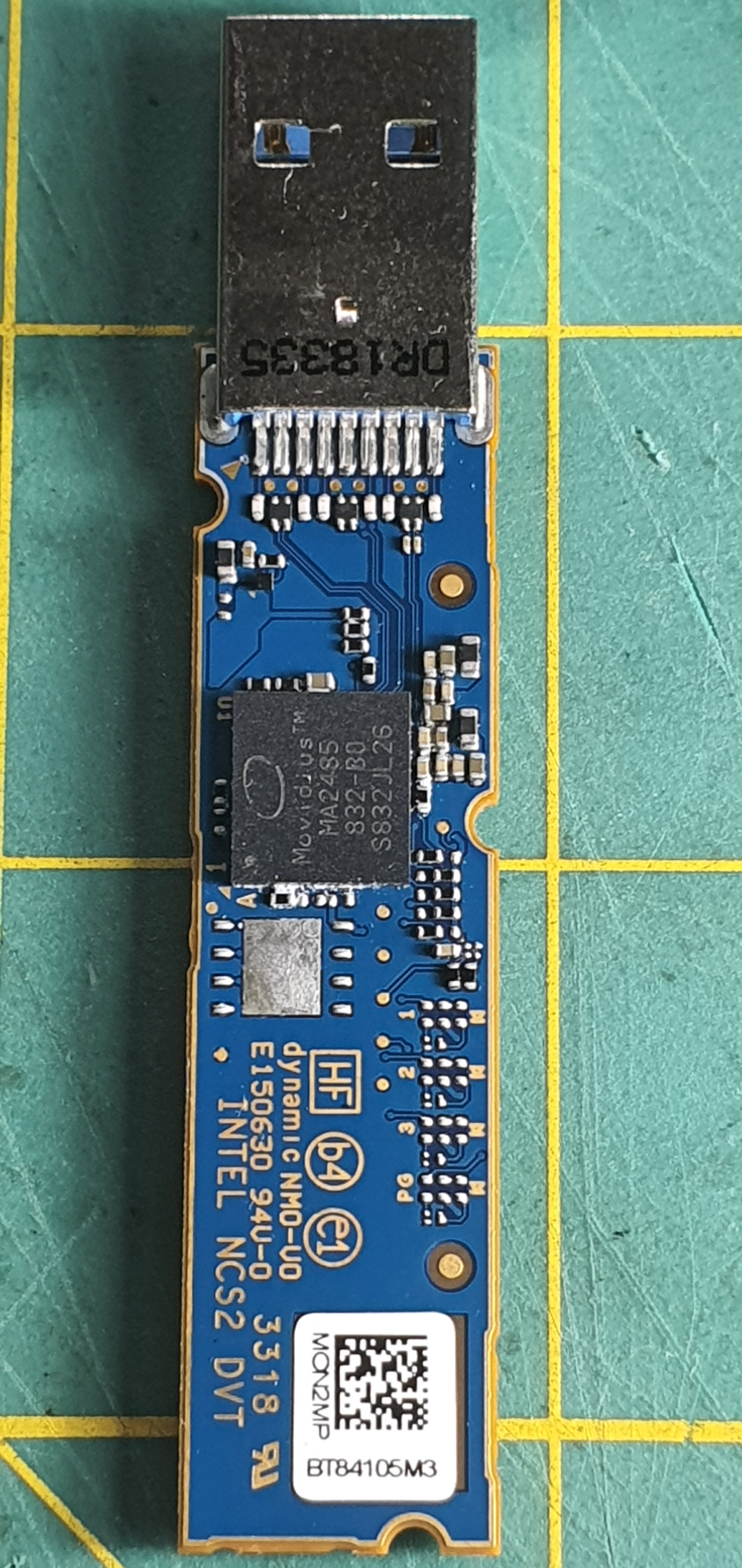
Intel NCS2 PCB front

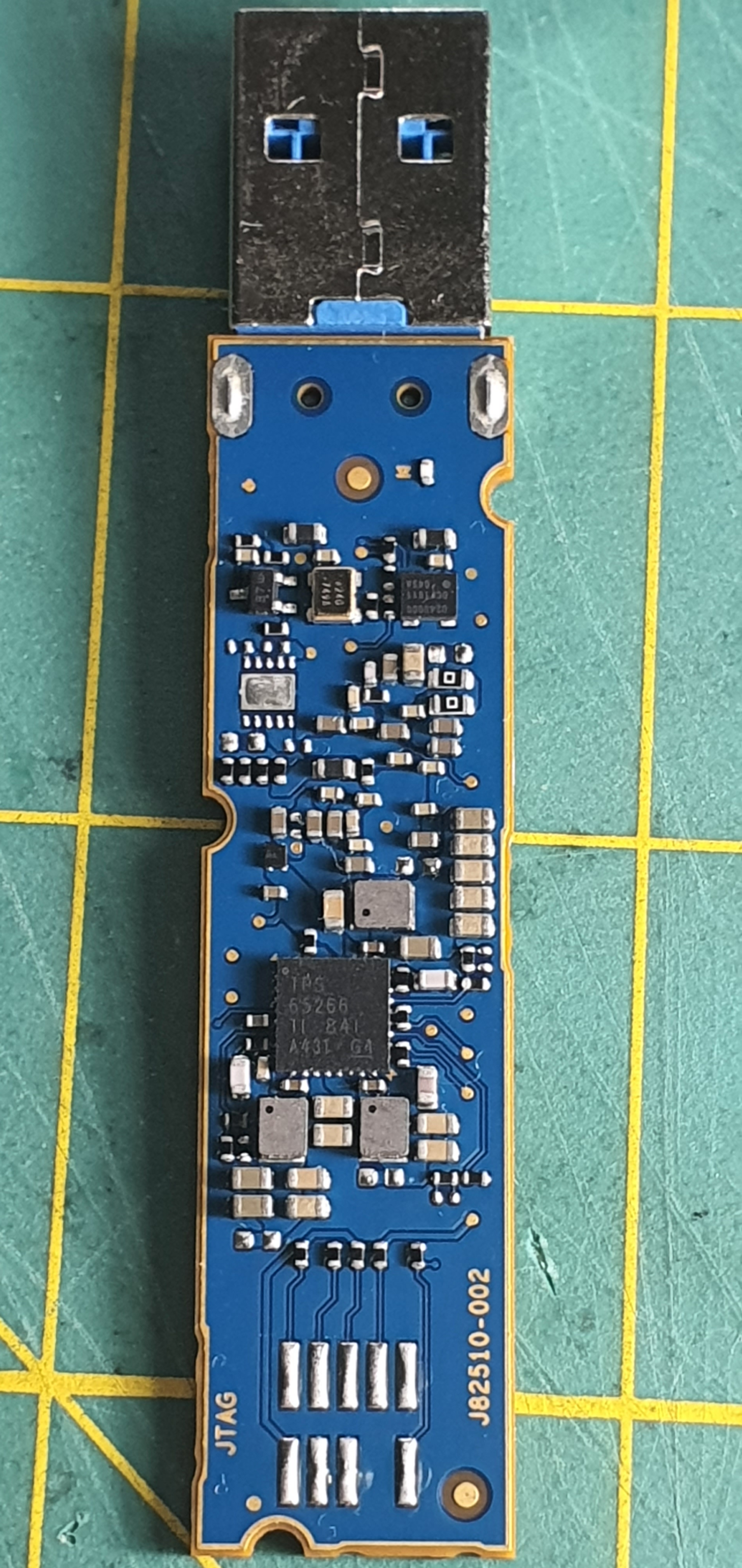
Intel NCS2 PCB back

The Intel Movidius Neural Compute Stick (NCS) is a compact device designed to facilitate the development of deep learning applications at the network edge. It utilizes the Intel Movidius Myriad 2 Vision Processing Unit (VPU), which is also found in various smart devices like security cameras, gesture-controlled drones, and industrial machine vision systems. The NCS supports frameworks such as TensorFlow and Caffe for developing neural network models.

The second iteration, the Intel Neural Compute Stick 2 (NCS 2), was introduced on November 14, 2018, at the AI DevCon event in Beijing. This version is based on the Myriad X VPU, which significantly improves performance over the original, providing up to eight times the processing capability for AI inference tasks. The NCS 2 is designed to work seamlessly with the Intel Distribution of OpenVINO toolkit, which helps developers optimize and deploy their models efficiently.

The NCS connects to a host machine via a USB interface, allowing developers to rapidly prototype and deploy deep neural network applications without the need for cloud connectivity. This makes it suitable for various real-time, low-power applications where efficient on-device processing is essential.

== Uses ==
- Google Clips camera uses Myriad 2 VPU.
- The Intel RealSense Tracking Camera T265 uses the Myriad 2.
- In 2016, Mavic incorporated the Myriad 2 VPU in all its consumer drones.
- The Ryze Tello affordable programmable drone, licensing Mavic Software, uses the Myriad 2 VPU.
- ComBox Technology uses Myriad X in ComBox x64 PCIe Blad board for CNN inference in DC.
- TiltFive AR Glasses use a Movidius Myriad X to compute the reprojection to show the user

== See also ==
- MPSoC
- Coprocessor
- Convolutional neural network
