= Polytope model =

Framework for computer program optimization

The polyhedral model (also called the polytope method) is a mathematical framework for programs that perform large numbers of operations -- too large to be explicitly enumerated -- thereby requiring a compact representation. Nested loop programs are the typical, but not the only example, and the most common use of the model is for loop nest optimization in program optimization. The polyhedral method treats each loop iteration within nested loops as lattice points inside mathematical objects called polyhedra, performs affine transformations or more general non-affine transformations such as tiling on the polytopes, and then converts the transformed polytopes into equivalent, but optimized (depending on targeted optimization goal), loop nests through polyhedra scanning.

== Simple example ==
Consider the following example written in C:

# define n 100
int i, j;
int a[n][n] = {{0,1}};

for (i = 1; i < n; i++) {
  for (j = 1; j < (i + 2) && j < n; j++) {
    a[i][j] = a[i - 1][j] + a[i][j - 1];
  }
}

for (i = 0; i < n; i++) {
  for (j = 0; j < n; ++j) {
    printf("%4d ", a[i][j]);
  }
  puts("");
}

The essential problem with this code is that each iteration of the inner loop on a[i][j] requires that the previous iteration's result, a[i][j - 1], be available already. Therefore, this code cannot be parallelized or pipelined as it is currently written.

An application of the polytope model, with the affine transformation $(i',\, j') = (i+j,\, j)$ and the appropriate change in the boundaries, will transform the nested loops above into:

a[i - j][j] = a[i - j - 1][j] + a[i - j][j - 1];

In this case, no iteration of the inner loop depends on the previous iteration's results; the entire inner loop can be executed in parallel. Indeed, given a(i, j) = a[i-j][j] then a(i, j) only depends on a(i - 1, x), with $x \in \{j - 1,\, j\}$. (However, each iteration of the outer loop does depend on previous iterations.)

== Detailed example ==
The dependencies of src, before loop skewing. The red dot corresponds to src[1][0]; the pink dot corresponds to src[2][2].

The following C code implements a form of error-distribution dithering similar to Floyd–Steinberg dithering, but modified for pedagogical reasons. The two-dimensional array src contains h rows of w pixels, each pixel having a grayscale value between 0 and 255 inclusive. After the routine has finished, the output array dst will contain only pixels with value 0 or value 255. During the computation, each pixel's dithering error is collected by adding it back into the src array. (Notice that src and dst are both read and written during the computation; src is not read-only, and dst is not write-only.)

Each iteration of the inner loop modifies the values in src[i][j] based on the values of src[i-1][j], src[i][j-1], and src[i+1][j-1]. (The same dependencies apply to dst[i][j]. For the purposes of loop skewing, we can think of src[i][j] and dst[i][j] as the same element.) We can illustrate the dependencies of src[i][j] graphically, as in the diagram on the right.

#define ERR(x, y) (dst[x][y] - src[x][y])

void dither(unsigned char** src, unsigned char** dst, int w, int h)
{
    int i, j;
    for (j = 0; j < h; ++j) {
        for (i = 0; i < w; ++i) {
            int v = src[i][j];
            if (i > 0)
                v -= ERR(i - 1, j) / 2;
            if (j > 0) {
                v -= ERR(i, j - 1) / 4;
                if (i < w - 1)
                    v -= ERR(i + 1, j - 1) / 4;
            }
            dst[i][j] = (v < 128) ? 0 : 255;
            src[i][j] = (v < 0) ? 0 : (v < 255) ? v : 255;
        }
    }
}

The dependencies of src, after loop skewing. The array elements will be processed in the order gray, red, green, blue, yellow...

Performing the affine transformation $(p,\, t) = (i,\, 2j+i)$ on the original dependency diagram gives us a new diagram, which is shown in the next image. We can then rewrite the code to loop on p and t instead of i and j, obtaining the following "skewed" routine.

 void dither_skewed(unsigned char **src, unsigned char **dst, int w, int h)  
 {
     int t, p;
     for (t = 0; t < (w + (2 * h)); ++t) {
         int pmin = max(t % 2, t - (2 * h) + 2);
         int pmax = min(t, w - 1);
         for (p = pmin; p <= pmax; p += 2) {
             int i = p;
             int j = (t - p) / 2;
             int v = src[i][j];
             if (i > 0)
               v -= ERR(i - 1, j) / 2;
             if (j > 0)
               v -= ERR(i, j - 1) / 4;
             if (j > 0 && i < w - 1)
               v -= ERR(i + 1, j - 1) / 4;
             dst[i][j] = (v < 128) ? 0 : 255;
             src[i][j] = (v < 0) ? 0 : (v < 255) ? v : 255;
         }
     }
 }

== See also ==
- Frameworks supporting the polyhedral model
- Loop nest optimization
- Loop optimization
- Loop unrolling
- Loop tiling

== External links and references ==
- "The basic polytope method", tutorial by Martin Griebl containing diagrams of the pseudocode example above
- "Code Generation in the Polytope Model" (1998). Martin Griebl, Christian Lengauer, and Sabine Wetzel
- "The CLooG Polyhedral Code Generator"
- "CodeGen+: Z-polyhedra scanning"
- PoCC: the Polyhedral Compiler Collection
- PLUTO - An automatic parallelizer and locality optimizer for affine loop nests
  - Bondhugula, Uday; Hartono, Albert; Ramanujam, J.; Sadayappan, P. (2008-01-01). "A practical automatic polyhedral parallelizer and locality optimizer". Proceedings of the 29th ACM SIGPLAN Conference on Programming Language Design and Implementation. PLDI '08. New York, NY, USA: ACM. pp. 101–113. doi:10.1145/1375581.1375595. ISBN 9781595938602. S2CID 7086982.
- polyhedral.info - A website that collect information about polyhedral compilation
- Polly - LLVM Framework for High-Level Loop and Data-Locality Optimizations
- The MIT Tiramisu Polyhedral Framework.
