= Loop scheduling =

In parallel computing, loop scheduling is the problem of assigning proper iterations of parallelizable loops among n processors to achieve load balancing and maintain data locality with minimum dispatch overhead.

Typical loop scheduling methods are:

- static even scheduling: evenly divide loop iteration space into n chunks and assign each chunk to a processor
- dynamic scheduling: a chunk of loop iteration is dispatched at runtime by an idle processor. When the chunk size is 1 iteration, it is also called self-scheduling.
- guided scheduling: similar to dynamic scheduling, but the chunk sizes per dispatch keep shrinking until reaching a preset value.

== See also ==
- OpenMP
- Automatic parallelization
- Loop nest optimization
