= Loop sectioning =

In geometry and the mathematical discipline of topology, loop strip-mining, or sectioning, is a special case of tiling, namely 1-dimensional tiling: a loop is transformed into a depth-2 loop nest, where the outer loop is called tile/block loop and the innermost loop is called element loop. Strip-mining was introduced for vector processors. It is a loop-transformation technique for enabling vectorization of loops and improving memory performance.

The term strip-mine is really inspired from mining coal, for example, with the excavator, which uses a bucket (or bucket wheel) to "strip" the coal.
