= Ponnuswamy Sadayappan =

Indian-American computer engineer

Ponnuswamy Sadayappan is an academic and computer engineer based in the USA. As of 2023, he is Professor of Computer Science and Engineering at Kahlert School of Computing, University of Utah.

In 2015, while at Ohio State University, Sadayappan was named Fellow of the Institute of Electrical and Electronics Engineers (IEEE) in 2015 for contributions to parallel programming tools for high-performance computing.

== Education ==
Sadayappan earned a B.Tech. undergraduate degree at the Indian Institute of Technology Madras in Chennai, India. He completed his master's degree and doctorate at Stony Brook University, New York.
