= Power Processing Element =

In microprocessor architecture

General information
- Launched: 2005
- Discontinued: Present
- Marketed by: IBM, Sony, Microsoft
- Designed by: IBM
- Common manufacturer: IBM

Performance
- Max. CPU clock rate: 2.8 GHz to 3.2 GHz

Cache
- L1 cache: 32 KB instruction + 32 KB data

Architecture and classification
- Application: Gaming Console, HPC
- Technology node: 90 nm to 45 nm
- Microarchitecture: PPU
- Instruction set: PowerPC 2.02

Physical specifications
- Cores: 1
- GPUs: Xenos, in the XCGPU variant.

Products, models, variants
- Variant: Cell BE, XCPU, XCGPU, PowerXCell 8i

History
- Successor: IBM A2

The Power Processing Element (PPE) comprises a Power Processing Unit (PPU) and a 512 KB L2 cache. In most instances the PPU is used in a PPE. The PPU is a 64-bit dual-threaded in-order PowerPC 2.02 microprocessor core designed by IBM for use primarily in the game consoles PlayStation 3 and Xbox 360, but has also found applications in high performance computing in supercomputers such as the record setting IBM Roadrunner.

The PPU is used as a main CPU core in three different processor designs:

- The Cell Broadband Engine (Cell BE) which is used primarily in Sony's PlayStation 3 gaming console. It uses the PPE and comes in three versions, a 90 nm, a 65 nm and a 45 nm part.
- The PowerXCell 8i which is a version of the Cell BE with enhanced FPU and memory subsystem. It was only manufactured as a single 65 nm version.
- The XCPU which is used in a three-core configuration and a unified 1 MB L2 cache inside Microsoft's Xbox 360. It comes in three versions, the 90 nm and 65 nm versions, and the 45 nm XCGPU with an integrated graphics processor from ATI.

== Main features ==
- 64-bit, dual-threaded core
- 3.2 GHz typical clockrate
- 32 KB L1 instruction cache
- 32 KB L1 data cache
- 512 KB unified L2 cache, 8-way set associative in the PPE variant.
- Compatible with 64-bit PowerPC ISA v.2.02 (POWER4 and PowerPC 970)
- AltiVec SIMD functionality

== Execution units ==
- Branch Unit (BRU)
- Fixed Point Integer Unit (FXU)
- Load and Store Unit (LSU)
- Floating-Point Unit (FPU)
- Vector Media Extension Unit (VMX)

== In-order ==
The PPU is an in-order processor, but it has some unique traits which allow it to achieve some benefits of out-of-order execution without expensive re-ordering hardware. Upon reaching an L1 cache miss – it can execute past the cache miss, stopping only when an instruction is actually dependent on a load. It can send up to 8 load instructions to the L2 cache out-of-order. It has an instruction delay pipe – a side path that allows it to execute instructions that would normally cause pipeline stalls without holding up the rest of the pipeline. The instruction delay pipeline is used for the Out-Of-Order Load/Stores: cache misses are put there while it moves on.

== The PPE's pipeline ==
The PPE has a 23-stage general pipeline with an additional 11 stages possible for microcode and an additional 4 stages possible for branch prediction.

== Multithreading ==
The PPU runs two hardware threads simultaneously. The main registers for code execution are duplicated, as are the exception and interrupt-handling registers, and several essential arrays and queues. They can generate exceptions simultaneously, and perform branch prediction on their individual branch histories. The execution engine and caches are not duplicated though – so it is still just a single-core design.

== Floating-point capacity ==
Its 64-bit double-precision floating-point unit, and 128-bit VMX unit (using the AltiVec instruction set), can perform a theoretical 12 floating-point operations per cycle, as its floating-point unit can do floating-point multiply-adds, and come no smaller than 64-bits. That gives 3.2 billion clock cycles × 12 = 38.4 billion floating-point operations/second.

The PPU is enhanced in the PowerXCell 8i processor to be able to make single cycle double precision floating point operations, tailored for high performance computing in supercomputers.

The VMX unit in the XCPU in the Xbox 360 is enhanced with 128 registers and is not entirely compatible with regular AltiVec.
