= ScicomP =

Organization

The IBM HPC Systems Scientific Computing User Group (ScicomP) was a non-profit, user-led group for scientific and technical users of IBM high-performance computing (HPC) systems. It was part of the SPXXL organization. It held yearly meetings with presentations to allow users to share expertise and collaborate on the development of efficient and scalable scientific applications. Though not affiliated with IBM Corporation, the group's meetings provided an opportunity to give feedback to IBM that would influence the design of future systems.

In 2014, IBM's x86-based server business was transferred to Lenovo, and SPXXL dropped the vendor requirement, opening membership to all HPC vendors. Active vendors included IBM, Lenovo, Intel, and Mellanox as of 2016. As of 2016, Lenovo still engaged with the user group. It later became HPCXXL

== History ==
ScicomP was formed in October 1999 when 285 researchers and engineers met at IBM's Advanced Computing Technology Center (ACTC) at IBM Research in Yorktown Heights, New York. The meeting was a user-oriented 3-day workshop to share information on scientific computing techniques for users of IBM SP supercomputers. It was created on the recommendations of attendees of the IBM SP Scientific Applications Development and Optimization Workshop held in March 1999 at the San Diego Supercomputer Center.

ScicomP held annual and semi-annual meetings that brought together scientific domain experts, computational scientists, systems engineers, and IBM technical specialists. The domain encompassed all IBM HPC systems, including Power Systems, Blue Gene, Cell, hybrid architectures (e.g. the Los Alamos RoadRunner system), and IBM BladeCenter platforms. Meetings alternated between supercomputing sites in North America and Europe.
