= CBEA =

CBEA may stand for:

- Cell Broadband Engine Architecture, the microprocessor architecture in the PlayStation 3
- Consciousness-Based Education Association, a 501(c) foundation with ties to Maharishi Mahesh Yogi
- Confederação Brasileira de Esqui-Aquático, a Brazilian water ski confederation
