= SpursEngine =

Microprocessor from Toshiba

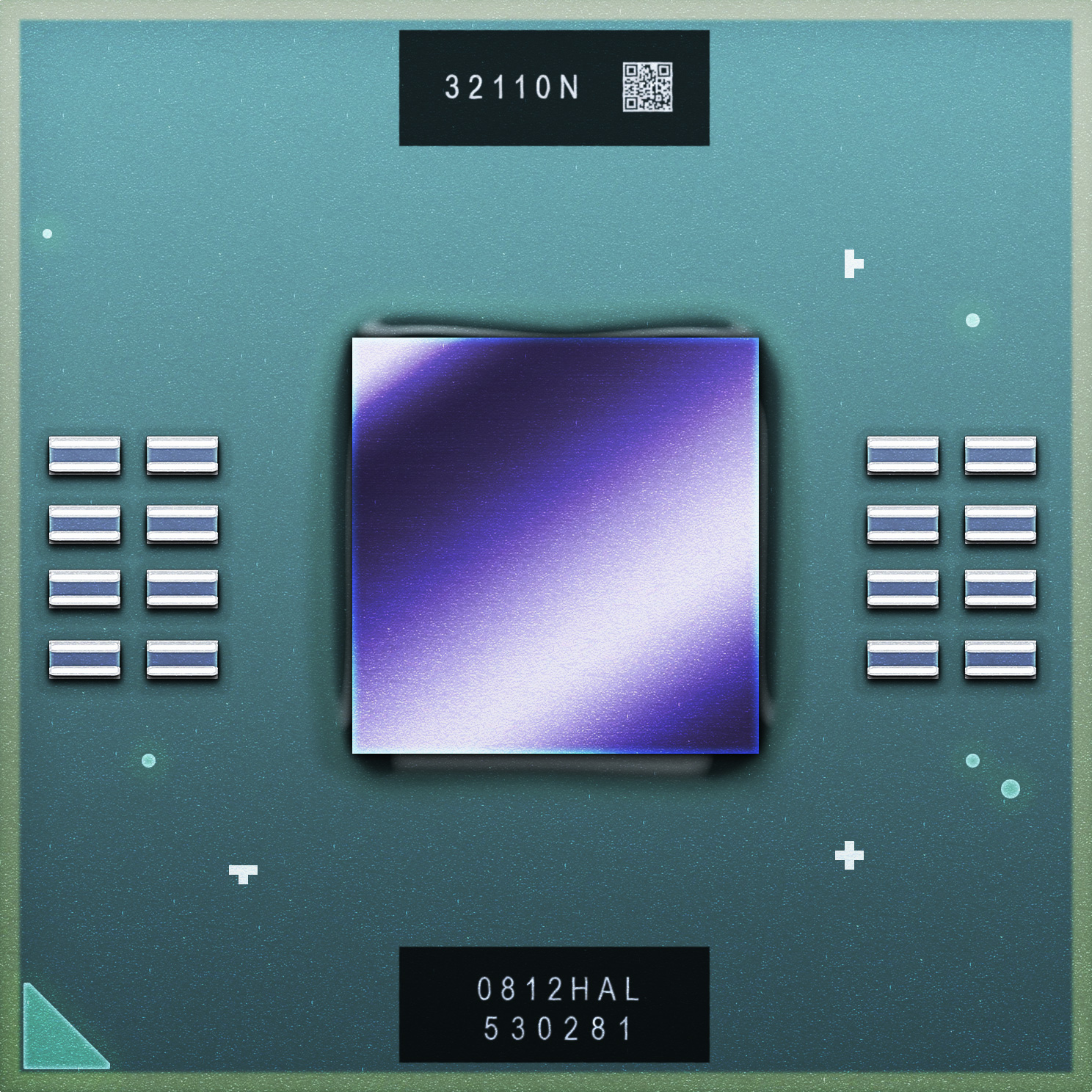
An illustration of the SpursEngine SE1000 processor

SpursEngine is a microprocessor from Toshiba built as a media oriented coprocessor, designed for 3D- and video processing in consumer electronics such as set-top boxes and computers. The SpursEngine processor is also known as the Quad Core HD processor. It was announced on September 20, 2007.

The SpursEngine is a stream processor powered by four Synergistic Processing Elements (SPE), also used in the Cell processor featured in Sony PlayStation 3. These processing elements are fed by on chip H.264 and MPEG-2 codecs and controlled by an off die host CPU, connected by an on chip PCIe controller (in contrast to the Cell processor which has an on chip CPU (the PPE) doing similar work). To enable smoother interaction between the host and the SpursEngine Toshiba also integrated a simple proprietary 32-bit control core. The SpursEngine employs dedicated XDR DRAM as its working memory.

The SpursEngine is designed to work at much lower frequencies than the Cell and Toshiba has also optimized the circuit layout of the SPEs to reduce the size by 30%. The resulting chip consumes 10-20 W of power.

The SpursEngine is accessible to the developer from a device driver developed for Windows and Linux systems. Software supporting the SpursEngine is limited and is primarily in the realm of video editing and encoding.

== Technical specification ==
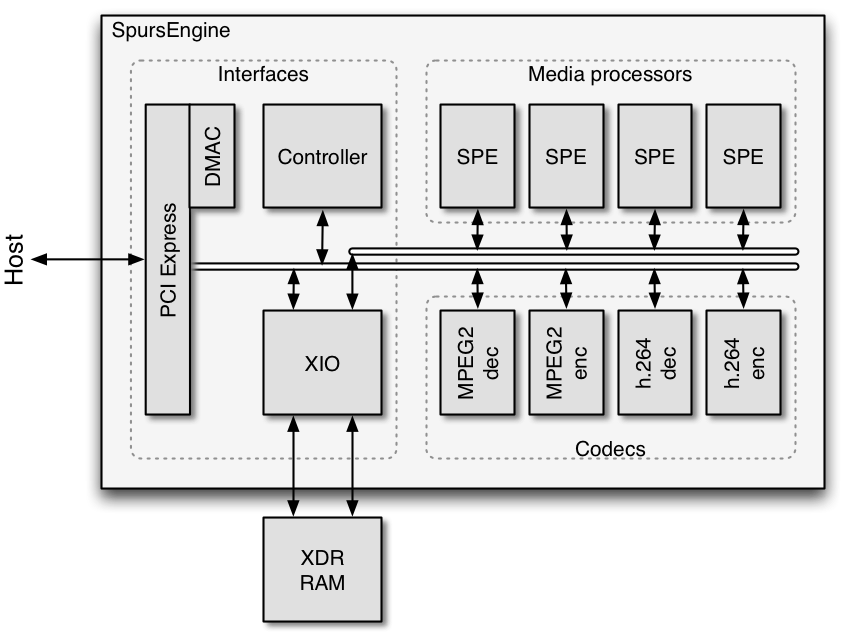
Logic schematic of the SpursEngine chip

The first generation of SpursEngine processors are specified as follows:

- Built with a 65 nm bulk CMOS fabrication process with 7 layers of copper interconnect
- 9.98 mm × 10.31 mm (102.89 mm²) large die
- 239.1 million transistors (Logic: 134 M, SRAM:104.8 M)
- Thermal design power: <20 W
- Max frequency: 1.5 GHz
- Packaged in a 624 pin FC-BGA (Flip Chip-Ball Grid Array)
- 48 GFLOPS peak performance (12 GFLOPS per SPU @ 1.5 GHz)

== Commercialization ==
In April 2008 Toshiba shipped samples of the SpursEngine SE1000 device, a PCIe-based reference board.

- The accelerator card connects to a 1x PCI Express bus and has 128 MB XDR DRAM with 12.8 GB/s bandwidth.
- Leadtek is producing the WinFast PxVC1100 and HPVC1100, internal and external PCIe accelerators based on the SE1000 platform.
- Thomson-Canopus has announced the Firecoder Blu, a PCIe accelerator based on the SE1000 platform.

Toshiba included the SpursEngine processors in their Qosmio laptops, models F50, G50 and G55, in the third quarter of 2008.

== See also ==
- Cell (microprocessor)
