= Xenon (processor) =

CPU used in the Xbox 360

Microsoft XCPU (codenamed Xenon)
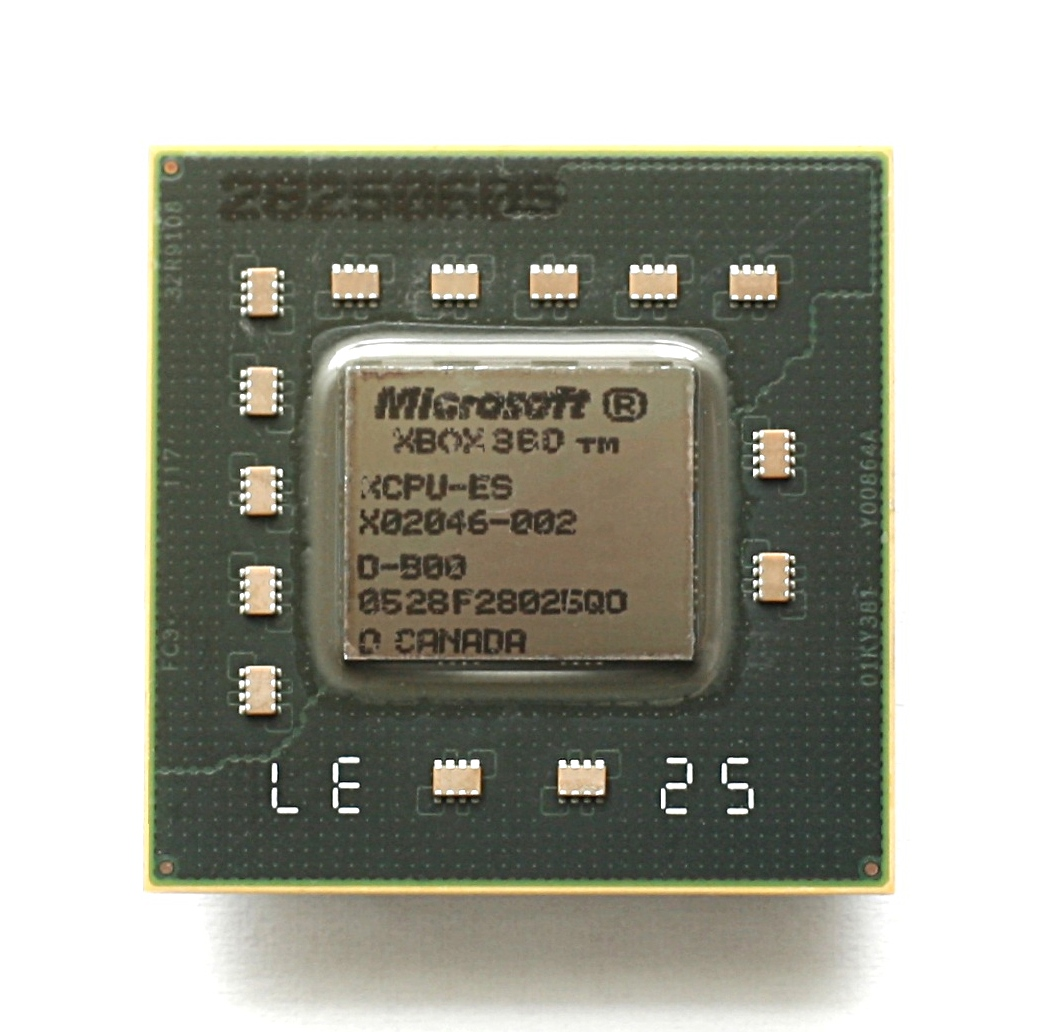
- Picture of the microprocessor (XCPU-ES shown)

General information
- Designed by: IBM
- Common manufacturer: IBM, GlobalFoundries

Physical specifications
- Cores: 3 cores

Cache
- L1 cache: 32/32 KB
- L2 cache: 1 MB

Architecture and classification
- Instruction set: PowerPC

Microsoft XCPU, codenamed Xenon, is a CPU used in the Xbox 360 game console, to be used with ATI's Xenos graphics chip.

The processor was developed by Microsoft and IBM under the IBM chip program codenamed "Waternoose", which was named after the Monsters, Inc. character Henry J. Waternoose III. The development program was originally announced on November 3, 2003.

The processor is based on IBM PowerPC instruction set architecture. It consists of three independent processor cores on a single die. These cores are slightly modified versions of the PPE in the Cell processor used on the PlayStation 3. Each core has two symmetric hardware threads (SMT), for a total of six hardware threads available to games. Each individual core also includes 32 KB of L1 instruction cache and 32 KB of L1 data cache.

The XCPU processors were manufactured at IBM's East Fishkill, New York fabrication plant and Chartered Semiconductor Manufacturing (now part of GlobalFoundries) in Singapore. Chartered reduced the fabrication process in 2007 to 65 nm from 90 nm, thus reducing manufacturing costs for Microsoft.

== Specifications ==
- 90 nm process, 65 nm process upgrade in 2007 (codenamed "Loki"), 45 nm process since Xbox 360 S model, 32 nm process since Xbox 360 E Winchester Motherboard.
- 165 million transistors
- Three cores, each two-way SMT-capable and clocked at 3.2 GHz
- SIMD: Two VMX128 units with a dedicated (128×128 bit) register file for each core, one for each thread
- 1 MB L2 cache (lockable by the GPU) running at half-speed (1.6 GHz) with a 256-bit bus
- 51.2 GB/s of L2 memory bandwidth (256 bit × 1600 MHz)
- 21.6 GB/s front-side bus (On the CPU side, this interfaces to a 1.35 GHz, 8B wide, FSB dataflow; on the GPU side, it connects to a 16B wide FSB dataflow running at 675 MHz.)
- Dot product performance: 9.6 billion per second
- In-order instruction execution
- 768 bits of IBM eFUSE-based OTP memory
- ROM (and 64 KB SRAM) storing Microsoft's Secure Bootloader, and encryption hypervisor
- Big-endian architecture

== XCGPU ==
The Xbox 360 S introduced the XCGPU (codename Vejle), which integrated the Xenon CPU and the Xenos GPU onto the same die, and the eDRAM into the same package. The XCGPU follows the trend started with the integrated EE+GS in PlayStation 2 Slimline, combining CPU, GPU, memory controllers and IO in a single cost-reduced chip. It also contains a "front side bus replacement block" that connects the CPU and GPU internally in exactly the same manner as the front side bus would have done when the CPU and GPU were separate chips, so that the XCGPU doesn't change the hardware characteristics of the Xbox 360.

XCGPU contains 372 million transistors and is manufactured by GlobalFoundries on a 45 nm process. Compared to the original chipset in the Xbox 360 the combined power requirements are reduced by 60% and the physical chip area by 50%.

In 2014, the Winchester Xbox 360 system introduced a shrunken XCGPU on a 32 nm process (codename Oban). This chip is no longer a multi-chip-module and integrates the eDRAM into the main die.

== Gallery ==
Illustrations of the different generations of processors in Xbox 360 and Xbox 360 S.

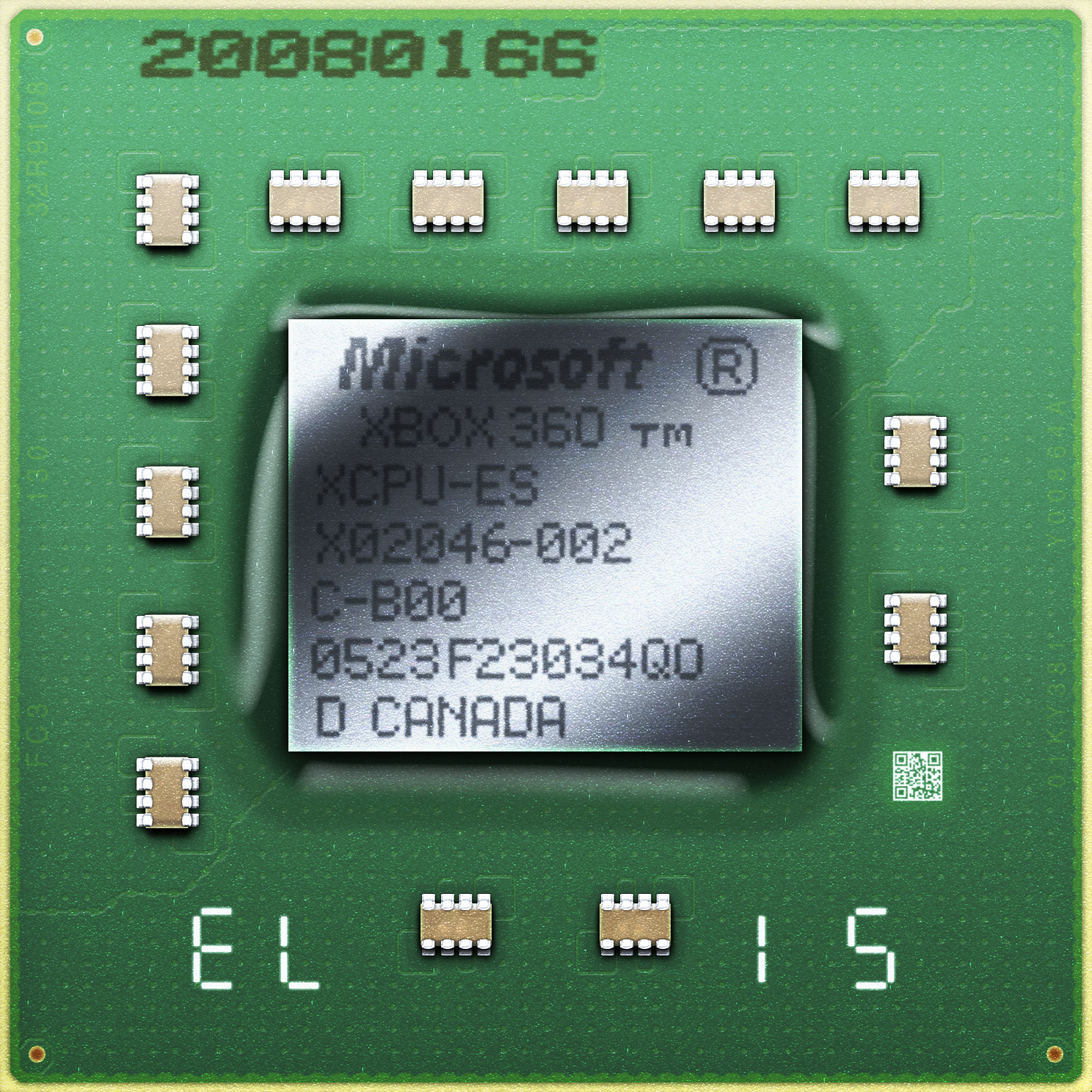
The original XCPU DD2 ES manufactured at 90 nm by IBM in 2005. ES stands for "Engineering Sample" and the device is packaged by IBM at their Bromont facility in Canada. It runs at 2.8GHz, as opposed to the final chip, which ran at 3.2GHz.

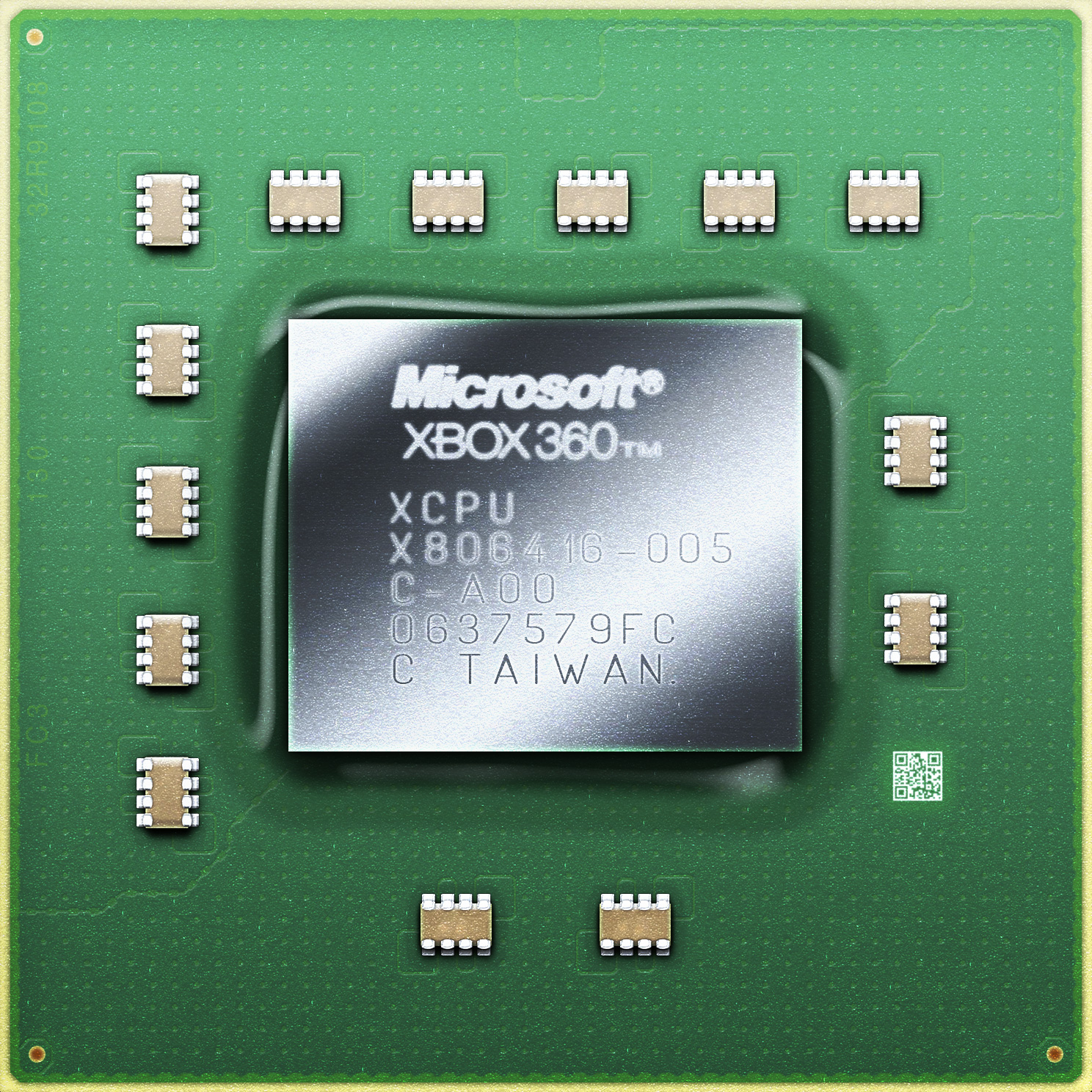
The 90nm XCPU DD3 manufactured at 90 nm by Chartered in Singapore 2006

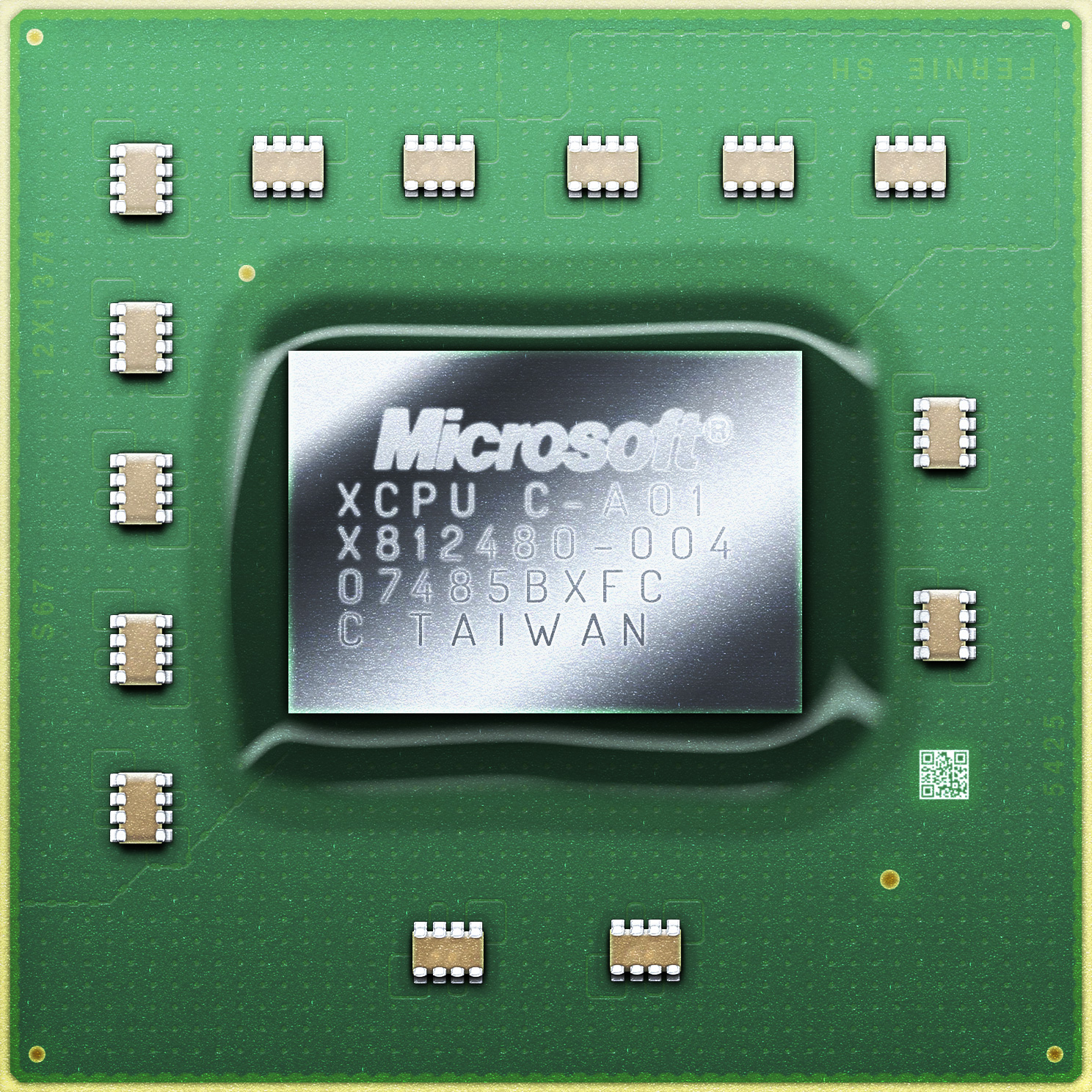
The 65nm XCPU "Loki" manufactured at 65 nm by Chartered in Singapore 2007

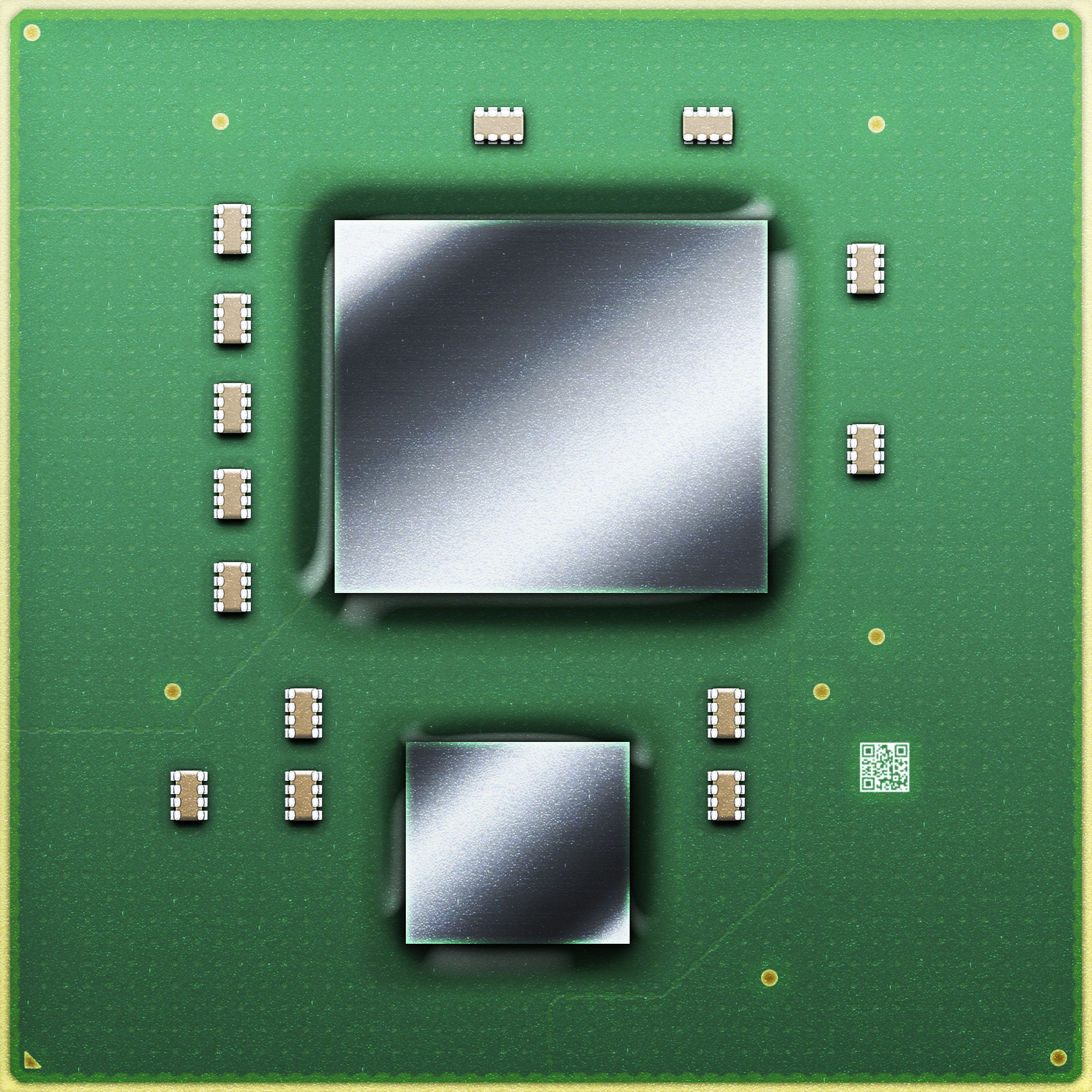
The two chips of the XCGPU "Vejle": The larger is the XCGPU itself and the smaller is the 10 MB eDRAM. Manufactured at 45 nm by Global Foundries in Singapore in 2010.

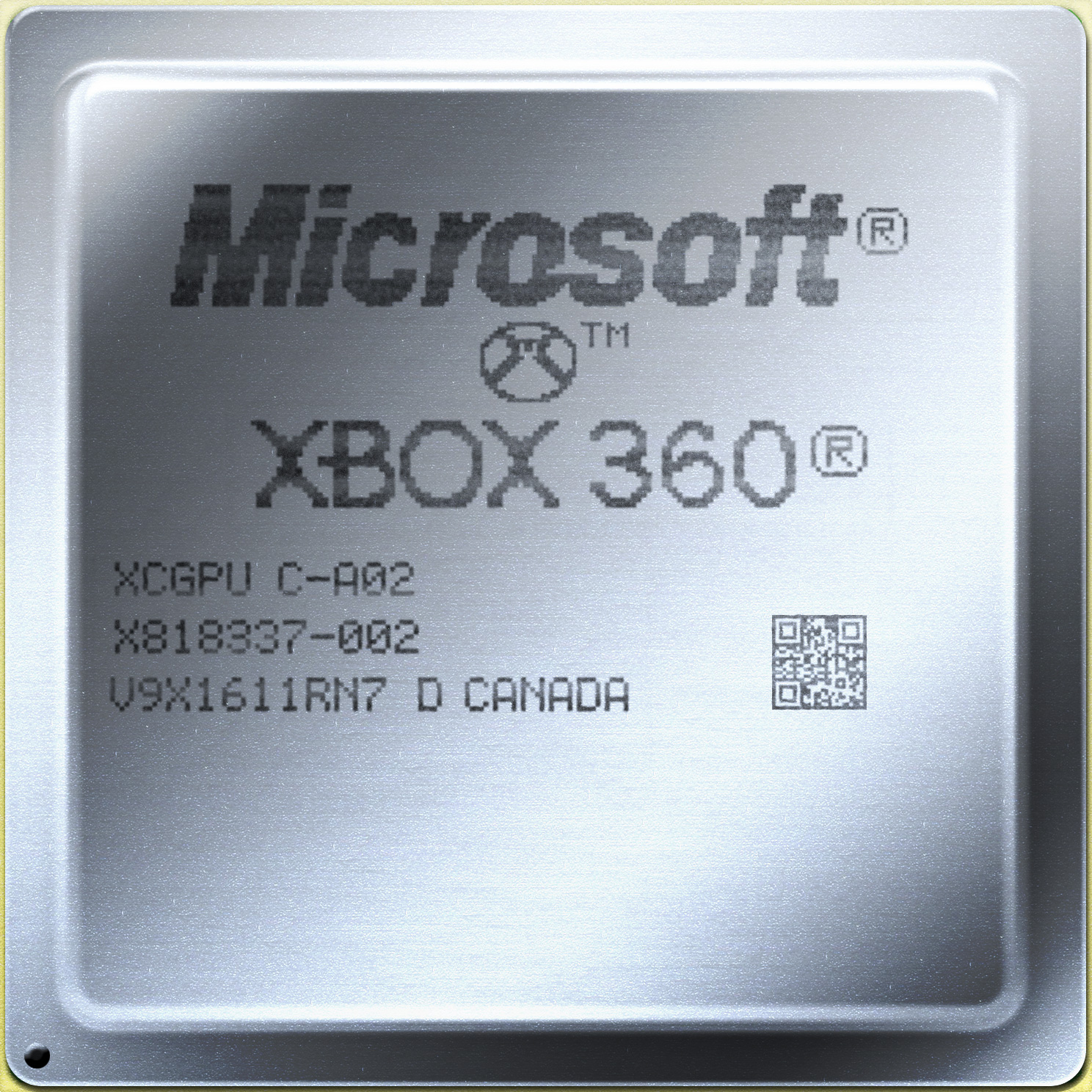
The XCGPU with heatspreader. The complete device is packaged by IBM at their Bromont facility in Canada.
