= Qualcomm Hexagon =

Family of digital signal processor microprocessors

Hexagon
- Designer: Qualcomm
- Bits: 32-bit, 64-bit
- Introduced: 2006 (QDSP6)
- Design: 4-way multithreaded VLIW
- Type: Load–store
- Encoding: Fixed 4 byte per instruction, up to 4 instructions in VLIW multiinstruction
- Open: Proprietary

Registers
- General-purpose: 32-bit GPR: 32, can be paired to 64-bit

Hexagon is the brand name for a family of digital signal processor (DSP) and later neural processing unit (NPU) products by Qualcomm. Hexagon is also known as QDSP6, standing for "sixth generation digital signal processor." According to Qualcomm, the Hexagon architecture is designed to deliver performance with low power over a variety of applications.

Each version of Hexagon has an instruction set and a micro-architecture. These two features are intimately related.

Hexagon is used in Qualcomm Snapdragon chips, for example in smartphones, cars, wearable devices and other mobile devices and is also used in components of cellular phone networks.

== Instruction set architecture ==
Computing devices have instruction sets, which are their lowest, most primitive languages. Common instructions are those which cause two numbers to be added, multiplied or combined in other ways, as well as instructions that direct the processor where to look in memory for its next instruction. There are many other types of instructions.

Assemblers and compilers that translate computer programs into streams of instructions – bit streams - that the device can understand and carry out (execute). As an instruction stream executes, the integrity of system function is supported by the use of instruction privilege levels. Privileged instructions have access to more resources in the device, including memory. Hexagon supports privilege levels.

Originally, Hexagon instructions operated on integer numbers but not floating point numbers, but in v5 floating point support was added.

The processing unit which handles execution of instructions is capable of in-order dispatching up to 4 instructions (the packet) to 4 execution units every clock.

== Micro-architecture ==
Micro-architecture is the physical structure of a chip or chip component that makes it possible for a device to carry out the instructions. A given instruction set can be implemented by a variety of micro-architectures. The buses – data transfer channels – for Hexagon devices are 32 bits wide. That is, 32 bits of data can be moved from one part of the chip to another in a single step. The Hexagon micro-architecture is multi-threaded, which means that it can simultaneously process more than one stream of instructions, enhancing data processing speed. Hexagon supports very long instruction words, which are groupings of four instructions that can be executed "in parallel." Parallel execution means that multiple instructions can run simultaneously without one instruction having to complete before the next one starts. The Hexagon micro-architecture supports single instruction, multiple data operations, which means that when a Hexagon device receives an instruction, it can carry out the operation on more than one piece of data at the same time.

According to 2012 estimation, Qualcomm shipped 1.2 billion DSP cores inside its system on a chip (SoCs) (average 2.3 DSP core per SoC) in 2011, and 1.5 billion cores were planned for 2012, making the QDSP6 the most shipped architecture of DSP (CEVA had around 1 billion of DSP cores shipped in 2011 with 90% of IP-licensable DSP market).

The Hexagon architecture is designed to deliver performance with low power over a variety of applications. It has features such as hardware assisted multithreading, privilege levels, very long instruction word (VLIW), single instruction, multiple data (SIMD), and instructions geared toward efficient signal processing. Hardware multithreading is implemented as barrel temporal multithreading - threads are switched in round-robin fashion each cycle, so the 600 MHz physical core is presented as three logical 200 MHz cores before V5. Hexagon V5 switched to dynamic multithreading (DMT) with thread switch on L2 misses, interrupt waiting or on special instructions.

At Hot Chips 2013 Qualcomm announced details of their Hexagon 680 DSP. Qualcomm announced Hexagon Vector Extensions (HVX). HVX is designed to allow significant compute workloads for advanced imaging and computer vision to be processed on the DSP instead of the CPU. In March 2015 Qualcomm announced their Snapdragon Neural Processing Engine SDK which allow AI acceleration using the CPU, GPU and Hexagon DSP.

Qualcomm's Snapdragon 855 contains their 4th generation on-device AI engine, which includes the Hexagon 690 DSP and Hexagon Tensor Accelerator (HTA) for AI acceleration. Snapdragon 865 contains the 5th generation on-device AI engine based on the Hexagon 698 DSP capable of 15 trillion operations per second (TOPS). Snapdragon 888 contains the 6th generation on-device AI engine based on the Hexagon 780 DSP capable of 26 TOPS. Snapdragon 8 contains the 7th generation on-device AI engine based on the Hexagon DSP capable of 52 TOPS and up to 104 TOPS in some cases.

== Software support ==
=== Operating systems ===
The port of Linux for Hexagon runs under a hypervisor layer ("Hexagon Virtual Machine") and was merged with the 3.2 release of the kernel. The original hypervisor is closed-source, and in April 2013 a minimal open-source hypervisor implementation for QDSP6 V2 and V3, the "Hexagon MiniVM" was released by Qualcomm under a BSD-style license.

=== Compilers ===
Support for Hexagon was added in 3.1 release of LLVM by Tony Linthicum. Hexagon/HVX V66 ISA support was added in 8.0.0 release of LLVM. There is also a non-FSF maintained branch of GCC and binutils.

== Adoption of the SIP block ==
Qualcomm Hexagon DSPs have been available in Qualcomm Snapdragon SoC since 2006. In Snapdragon S4 (MSM8960 and newer) there are three QDSP cores, two in the Modem subsystem and one Hexagon core in the Multimedia subsystem. Modem cores are programmed by Qualcomm only, and only Multimedia core is allowed to be programmed by user.

They are also used in some femtocell processors of Qualcomm, including FSM98xx, FSM99xx and FSM90xx.

== Third-party integration ==
In March 2016, it was announced that semiconductor company Conexant's AudioSmart audio processing software was being integrated into Qualcomm's Hexagon.

In May 2018 wolfSSL added support for using Qualcomm Hexagon. This is support for running wolfSSL crypto operations on the DSP. In addition to use of crypto operations a specialized operation load management library was later added.

== Versions ==
There are six versions of QDSP6 architecture released: V1 (2006), V2 (2007–2008), V3 (2009), V4 (2010–2011), QDSP6 V5 (2013, in Snapdragon 800), and QDSP6 V6 (2016, in Snapdragon 820) V4 has 20 DMIPS per milliwatt, operating at 500 MHz.

Clock speed of Hexagon varies in 400–2000 MHz for QDSP6 and in 256–350 MHz for previous generation of the architecture, the QDSP5.

Versions of QDSP6 (DSP/NPU)	Process node, nm	Year	Number of simultaneous threads	Per-thread clock, MHz	Total core clock, MHz	Product
QDSP6 V1	65	2006				
QDSP6 V2	65	2007	6	100	600	
QDSP6 V3 (1st gen)	45	2009	6	67	400	
QDSP6 V3 (2nd gen)	45	2009	4	100	400	
QDSP6 V4 (V4M, V4C, V4L)	28	2010	3	167	500	Snapdragon; 600
QDSP6 V5 (V5A, V5H)	28	2013	3	200 or greater with DMT	600	Snapdragon; 410/412/800/801
536	12/28	2014				205/208/210/212; Snapdragon; 425/427/429/430/435/439
V50 (or QDSP6 V5.0)	28	2014			700/800 (805)	Snapdragon; 415/610/615/616/805
546	14/28	2015				Snapdragon; 450/617/625/626/632
V56 (or QDSP6 V5.6)	20/28	2015			800 (808/810)	Snapdragon; 650/652/653/808/810
642	14	2017				Snapdragon; 630
680 (or QDSP6 V6)	14	2016	4	500	787 (660), 2000 (820 & 821)	Snapdragon; 636/660/820/821
682	10	2017				Snapdragon; 835
683	11	2020				Snapdragon; 460/662
685	10/11	2018	(3 TOPS)			Snapdragon; 670/675/678/710/712/845/850
686	6/8/11	2019	(3.3 TOPS)			Snapdragon; 480/480+/665/680/685/695
688	8	2019	(3.6 TOPS)			Snapdragon; 730/730G/732G
690	7	2019	(7 TOPS/ 9 TOPS)			Snapdragon; 855/855+/860/8c/8cx/8cx Gen 2 Microsoft SQ1/SQ2
692	8	2020	(5 TOPS)			Snapdragon; 690/720G/7c/7c Gen 2
694	8	2020	(4.7 TOPS)			Snapdragon; 750G
696	7	2020	(5.4 TOPS)			Snapdragon; 765/765G/768G
698	7	2020	(15 TOPS)			Snapdragon; 865/865+/870/8cx Gen 3 Microsoft SQ3
770	5/6	2021	(12 TOPS)			Snapdragon; 778G/778G+/780G/782G
780	5	2021	(26 TOPS/ 32 TOPS)			Snapdragon; 888/888+
790 (NPU/HTP)	4	2021	(32 TOPS) (INT8)			Snapdragon; 8 Gen 1/8+ Gen 1
NPU (HTP Gen 2)	4	2022	(26 TOPS) (INT8)			Snapdragon; 8 Gen 2
NPU (HTP Gen 3)	4	2023	(34 TOPS) (INT8)			Snapdragon; 8 Gen 3/8s Gen 3
NPU (HTP Gen 4)	3	2024	(50 TOPS) (INT8)			Snapdragon; 8 Elite
NPU (HTP Gen 4)	4	2024	(45 TOPS) (INT8)			Snapdragon; X (Plus/Elite)

== Availability in Snapdragon products ==
Both Hexagon (QDSP6) and pre-Hexagon (QDSP5) cores are used in modern Qualcomm SoCs, QDSP5 mostly in low-end products. Modem QDSPs (often pre-Hexagon) are not shown in the table.

QDSP5 usage:

Snapdragon generation	Chipset (SoC) ID	DSP generation	DSP frequency, MHz	Process node, nm
S1	MSM7627, MSM7227, MSM7625, MSM7225	QDSP5	320	65
S1	MSM7627A, MSM7227A, MSM7625A, MSM7225A	QDSP5	350	45
S2	MSM8655, MSM8255, APQ8055, MSM7630, MSM7230	QDSP5	256	45
S4 Play	MSM8625, MSM8225	QDSP5	350	45
S200	8110, 8210, 8610, 8112, 8212, 8612, 8225Q, 8625Q	QDSP5	384	45 LP

QDSP6 (Hexagon) usage:

Snapdragon generation	Chipset (SoC) ID	QDSP6 version	DSP frequency, MHz	Process node, nm
S1	QSD8650, QSD8250	QDSP6	600	65
S3	MSM8660, MSM8260, APQ8060	QDSP6 (V3?)	400	45
S4 Prime	MPQ8064	QDSP6 (V3?)	500	28
S4 Pro	MSM8960 Pro, APQ8064	QDSP6 (V3?)	500	28
S4 Plus	MSM8960, MSM8660A, MSM8260A, APQ8060A, MSM8930, MSM8630, MSM8230, APQ8030, MSM8627, MSM8227	QDSP6 (V3?)	500	28
S400	8926, 8930, 8230, 8630, 8930AB, 8230AB, 8630AB, 8030AB, 8226, 8626	QDSP6V4	500	28 LP
S600	8064T, 8064M	QDSP6V4	500	28 LP
S800	8974, 8274, 8674, 8074	QDSP6V5A	600	28 HPm
S820	8996	QDSP6V6	2000	14 FinFET LPP

== Hardware codec supported ==
The different video codecs supported by the Snapdragon SoCs.

D - decode; E - encode

FHD = FullHD = 1080p = 1920x1080px

HD = 720p which can be 1366x768px or 1280x720px

=== Snapdragon 200 series ===
The different video codecs supported by the Snapdragon 200 series.

Codec	Snapdragon 200	Snapdragon 200	Qualcomm 205	Snapdragon 208/210	Snapdragon 212
Availability	2013	2013	2017	2014	2015
Hexagon	QDSP5	QDSP6	536	536	536
H263	D & E	D & E	D & E	D & E	D & E
VC-1					
H.264	D & E	D & E	D & E	D & E	D & E
H.264 10-bit	-	-	-	-	-
VP8	D & E	D & E	D & E	D & E	D & E
H.265	D HD & E HD	D HD & E HD	D HD & E HD	D FHD & E HD	D FHD & E HD
H.265 10-bit	-	-	-	-	-
H.265 12-bit	-	-	-	-	-
VVC					
VP9	-	-	-	-	-
VP9 10-bit	-	-	-	-	-
AV1	-	-	-	-	-

=== Snapdragon 400 series ===
The different video codecs supported by the Snapdragon 400 series.

Codec	Snapdragon 400	Snapdragon 410/415	Snapdragon 425/427	Snapdragon 429/439	Snapdragon 450	Snapdragon 460	Snapdragon 480/480+
Availability	Q4 2013	2014/2015	Q1 2016/Q3 2017	Q2 2018	Q2 2017	Q1 2020	Q1 2021
Hexagon	QDSP6	QDSP6 V5	536(256KB)	536	546	683	686
H263	D & E	D & E	D & E	D & E	D & E	D & E	D & E
VC-1							
H.264	D & E	D & E	D & E	D & E	D & E	D & E	D & E
H.264 10-bit	-	-	-	-	-	-	D & E
VP8	D & E	D & E	D & E	D & E	D & E	D & E	D & E
H.265	-	D & E	D & E	D & E	D & E	D & E	D & E
H.265 10-bit	-	-	-	-	-	-	
H.265 12-bit	-	-	-	-	-	-	
VVC	-	-	-	-	-	-	
VP9	-	-	-	-	D & E	D & E	
VP9 10-bit	-	-	-	-	-	-	
AV1	-	-	-	-	-	-	-
Video frame rate support, decoding						HD 60 fps	
Video frame rate support, decoding				FHD 60 fps	FHD 60 fps	FHD 60 fps	
Video frame rate support, encoding						HD 60 fps	
Video frame rate support, encoding				FHD 60 fps	FHD 60 fps	FHD 60 fps	

=== Snapdragon 600 series ===
The different video codecs supported by the Snapdragon 600 series.

Codec	Snapdragon 600	Snapdragon 610	Snapdragon 650/652/653	Snapdragon 630	Snapdragon 632	Snapdragon 636/660	Snapdragon 662	Snapdragon 665/680	Snapdragon 670/675/678	Snapdragon 690
Availability	Q1 2013		Q1 2015		Q2 2018		Q1 2020	Q2 2019	2019	Q2 2020
Hexagon	QDSP6 V4	QDSP6 V50	QDSP6 V56	642	546	680	683	686	685	692
H263	D & E	D & E	D & E	D & E	D & E	D & E	D & E	D & E	D & E	D & E
VC-1			D & ?							
H.264	D & E	D & E	D & E	D & E	D & E	D & E	D & E	D & E	D & E	D & E
H.264 10-bit	-	-	-	-	-	-	-	-	-	
VP8	D & E	D & E	D & E	D & E	D & E	D & E	D & E	D & E	D & E	D & E
H.265	-		D & E	D & E	D & E	D & E	D & E	D & E	D & E	D & E
H.265 10-bit	-	-	-	D & ?	-	D & ?	-	-		D & E
VVC	-	-	-	-	-	-	-	-	-	-
VP9	-	-	D & ?	D & E	D & E	D & E	D & E	D & E	D & E	D & E
VP9 10-bit	-	-	-	-	-	-	-	-	-	
AV1	-	-	-	-	-	-	-	-	-	-
FPS
Video decoding frame rate support	HD 60 fps	HD 120 fps		HD 240 fps	HD 240 fps	HD 240 fps	HD 60 fps	HD 240 fps	HD 240 fps	HD 240 fps
Video decoding frame rate support	FHD 30 fps	FHD 60 fps	FHD 120 fps	FHD 120 fps	FHD 120 fps	FHD 120 fps	FHD 60 fps	FHD 120 fps	FHD 120 fps	FHD 120 fps
Video decoding frame rate support	No 4K	No 4K	4K30 fps	4K30 fps	4K30 fps	4K30 fps	No 4K	4K60 fps	4K60 fps	4K60 fps
Video encoding frame rate support	HD 60 fps	HD 60 fps		HD 240 fps	HD 240 fps	HD 240 fps	HD 60 fps	HD 240 fps	HD 240 fps	HD 240 fps
Video encoding frame rate support	FHD 30 fps	FHD 30 fps	FHD 120 fps	FHD 120 fps	FHD 120 fps	FHD 120 fps	FHD 60 fps	FHD 120 fps	FHD 120 fps	FHD 120 fps
Video encoding frame rate support	No 4K	No 4K	4K30 fps	4K30 fps	4K30 fps	4K30 fps	No 4K	4K30 fps	4K30 fps	4K30 fps
HDR formats
Display and playback										HDR10, HLG
Video recording										HDR10, HLG

=== Snapdragon 700 series ===
The different video codecs supported by the Snapdragon 700 series.

Codec	Snapdragon 710/712	Snapdragon 720G	Snapdragon 730G/732G	Snapdragon 765/765G /768G	Snapdragon 778G	Snapdragon 780G
Availability	Q2 2018 / Q1 2019	Q1 2020	Q2 2019 / Q3 2020	Q2 2019 / Q2 2019 / Q2 2020	Q2 2021	Q1 2021
Hexagon	685	692	688	696	770	770
H263	D & E	D & E	D & E	D & E		
VC-1	D & E	D & E	D & E	D & E		
H.264	D & E	D & E	D & E	D & E		
H.264 10-bit	-	-	?	?		
VP8	D & E	D & E	D & E	D & E		
H.265	D & E	D & E	D & E	D & E		
H.265 10-bit	D	D	D & E	D & E		
H.265 12-bit	-	-	-	-		
VVC	-	-	-	-		
VP9	D & E	D & E	D & E	D & E		
VP9 10-bit	D	D	D	D		
AV1	-	-	-	-		
FPS
Video frame rate, decoding	HD 240 fps	HD 240 fps	HD 240 fps	HD 480 fps		
Video frame rate, decoding	FHD 120 fps	FHD 120 fps	FHD 120 fps	?		
Video frame rate, decoding	4K 30fps	4K 30fps	4K 30fps	4K 60fps		
Video frame rate support, encoding	HD 240 fps	HD 240 fps	HD 240 fps	HD 480 fps		
Video frame rate support, encoding	FHD 120 fps	FHD 120 fps	FHD 120 fps	?		
Video frame rate support, encoding	4K 30fps	4K 30fps	4K 30fps	?		
HDR formats
Display and playback	10-bit HDR	HDR10, HLG		HDR10, HLG, HDR10+		
Video recording	—N/a	—N/a	HDR10, HLG	HDR10, HLG, HDR10+		
Photo recording	—N/a	—N/a	—N/a	—N/a	10-bit HDR HEIF	

=== Snapdragon 800 series ===
The different video codecs supported by the Snapdragon 800 series.

Codec	Snapdragon 800	Snapdragon 801	Snapdragon 805	Snapdragon 810	Snapdragon 820/821	Snapdragon 835	Snapdragon 845/850	Snapdragon 855/855+	Snapdragon 865/865+ /870	Snapdragon 888	Snapdragon 8 Gen 1
Availability	Q2 2013	Q1 2014	Q1 2014	Q3 2014	Q4 2015 Q3 2016	Q2 2017	Q1 2018	2019	2019 2021	Q4 2020	2021
Hexagon	QDSP6 V5	QDSP6 V5	QDSP6 V50	QDSP6 V56	680	682	685	690	698	780	790
MPEG-4	D & E	D & E	D & E	D & E	D & E	D & E	D & E	D & E	D & E	D & E	
H263	D & E	D & E	D & E	D & E	D & E	D & E	D & E	D & E	D & E	D & E	
VC-1					D & E	D & E	D & E	D & E	D & E	D & E	
H.264	D & E	D & E	D & E	D & E	D & E	D & E	D & E	D & E	D & E	D & E	
H.264 10-bit	N/A	N/A	N/A	N/A	N/A	N/A	D & E	D & E	D & E	D & E	
VP8	D & E	D & E	D & E	D & E	D & E	D & E	D & E	D & E	D & E	D & E	
H.265	N/A	D & E 720p@30	D & E	D & E	D & E	D & E	D & E	D & E	D & E	D & E	
H.265 10-bit	N/A	N/A	N/A	N/A	D	D	D & E	D & E	D & E	D & E	
VP9	N/A	N/A	N/A	N/A	D	D & E	D & E	D & E	D & E	D & E	
VP9 10-bit	N/A	N/A	N/A	N/A	D	D	D & E	D & E	D & E	D & E	
AV1	N/A	N/A	N/A	N/A	N/A	N/A	N/A	N/A	N/A	N/A	
VVC	N/A	N/A	N/A	N/A	N/A	N/A	N/A	N/A	N/A	N/A	
FPS											
Decoding FPS	HD@120			HD@240			HD@480	HD@480	HD@960		
Decoding FPS	FHD@60			FHD@120			FHD@240	FHD@240	?		
Decoding FPS	4K@30				4K@60			?	4K@120		
Decoding FPS	—N/a							8K@?	8K@60		
Encoding FPS	HD@120			HD@240			HD@480	HD@480	HD@960		
Encoding FPS	FHD@60			FHD@120			FHD@240	FHD@240	?		
Encoding FPS	4K@30						4K@60	4K@60	4K@120		
Encoding FPS	—N/a								8K@30		
HDR formats											
Display and playback	—N/a					HDR	HDR10, HLG	HDR10, HLG, HDR10+, Dolby Vision			
Video recording	—N/a						HDR10, HLG	HDR10, HLG, HDR10+	HDR10, HLG, HDR10+, Dolby Vision		
Photo recording	—N/a									10-bit HDR HEIF	

== Code sample ==
This is a single instruction packet from the inner loop of a FFT:

{ R17:16 = MEMD(R0++M1)
  MEMD(R6++M1) = R25:24
  R20 = CMPY(R20, R8):<<1:rnd:sat
  R11:10 = VADDH(R11:10, R13:12)
}:endloop0

This packet is claimed by Qualcomm to be equal to 29 classic RISC operations; it includes vector add (4x 16-bit), complex multiply operation and hardware loop support. All instructions of the packet are done in the same cycle.

== See also ==
- Qualcomm Snapdragon
- List of Qualcomm Snapdragon processors
- Nvidia NVDEC
- Nvidia NVENC
- Texas Instruments TMS320
- CEVA, Inc.
- Super Harvard Architecture Single-Chip Computer
- Digital signal processing
- Cryptography
- Instruction set architecture
- Microarchitecture
- Very long instruction word
- SIMD
- Multi-threading
- System on a chip
- Hypervisor
- Codec
- Fast Fourier transform
- Cellular network
- Conexant
