= LeechFTP =

- Original author: Jan Debis
- Initial release: 2 March 1998; 28 years ago
- Final release: 1.3 build 207 / April 16, 1999; 26 years ago
- Written in: Delphi
- Operating system: Microsoft Windows
- Size: 620 KB
- Available in: English, 19 translations
- Type: FTP client
- License: freeware

LeechFTP is a multi-threaded freeware FTP client by Jan Debis.

== History ==
LeechFTP was originally written in Delphi 3 and released on 2 March 1998. Updates to the program added features such as file drag & drop, resuming downloads, and thread-by-thread bandwidth throttling. The final release, version 1.3 build 207, was made public on 16 April 1999. By the end of development, add-on language packs were available in 19 languages, besides the default English.

=== BitBeamer ===
After ceasing development of LeechFTP, Debis moved on to develop a commercial trialware FTP client called BitBeamer, expanding on LeechFTP's features and reusing some of the code from LeechFTP. Development ended in 2001 after BitBeamer 1.0 Build 2025. Though it is still downloadable from some websites, it is no longer possible to register the trial version of BitBeamer even with a paid license, and therefore not possible to use the program after the 30-day trial period expires.
