= Dual processor =

In computer architecture, dual processor can refer to two different types of multiprocessing:

1. A computer with two central processing units
2. A dual-core central processing unit: two processors combined into a single integrated circuit or package
