= Bill Elliott's NASCAR Challenge =

1991 video game by Distinctive Software

- DOS/Amiga cover art
- Developer: Distinctive Software
- Publisher: Konami
- Designers: Bill Elliott; Don Mattrick; Stanley Chow; Amory Wong
- Programmers: Penny Lee; Alan Stewart; Ted Sylka; Rick Friesen; Amory Wong
- Artists: Athena Baxevanakis; Laura Luris
- Composers: Michael J. Sokyrka; Krisjan Hatlelid; Brian Plank
- Platforms: MS-DOS, Amiga, Macintosh, NES
- Release: March 1991 (NES)
- Genre: Racing
- Mode: Single-player

In-game screenshot of PC version

Bill Elliott's NASCAR Challenge is a video game developed by Distinctive Software and published by Konami and was released for MS-DOS, Amiga, Macintosh and Nintendo Entertainment System in 1991.

A very similar game, Bill Elliott's NASCAR Fast Tracks, was released for the Game Boy in 1991 by Konami.

This game is the first video game to ever secure the NASCAR license. It features eight real NASCAR tracks in the game, such as Watkins Glen and Talladega. This game is also the first to feature a real NASCAR driver in a PC game, Bill Elliott.

== Gameplay ==
Bill Elliott's NASCAR Challenge is a racing game simulation of the NASCAR Winston Cup circuit. Gameplay is always seen from an in-car perspective.

Before the race starts players can choose their car. There are three different racecars to choose from. A Pontiac Grand Prix, a Ford Thunderbird, and a Chevrolet Lumina.

Players could choose to run single races at each track, or run for the season championship. The race distances ranged from 10 miles to a more realistic distance of 500 miles for the superspeedway races. In the MS-DOS version, the championship consisted of a visit to each of the eight tracks. In the NES and Game Boy versions, the season championship consisted of each of the four tracks run twice, for a total of eight races. Championship points were awarded consistent to the real-life Winston Cup of the time.

The DOS version included an instant replay mode. The Amiga version included an instant replay mode.

The DOS version allowed the player modify the car set up. The player can play with damage on or off to effect the car's performance. However, a large enough collision with another racecar on the track always would result in the player going out of the race in an out-of-control crash.

== Contest ==
Photo of the contest entry form.

In 1991, Konami sponsored a contest where players could submit top scores for a chance to win a trip to the 1992 Daytona 500 to meet Bill Elliott, and a 1992 Ford Thunderbird. To enter, players were to send 35mm photographs of their final championship score using full race distances, manual transmission and regular damage settings.
