= NVDEC =

Feature in Nvidia graphics cards

NVDEC (formerly known as NVCUVID) is a feature in Nvidia graphics cards that performs video decoding, offloading this compute-intensive task from the CPU. NVDEC is a successor of PureVideo and is available in Kepler and later Nvidia GPUs.

It is accompanied by NVENC for video encoding in Nvidia's Video Codec SDK.

== Technology ==
NVDEC can offload video decoding to full fixed-function decoding hardware (Nvidia PureVideo), or (partially) decode via CUDA software running on the GPU, if fixed-function hardware is not available.

Depending on the GPU architecture, the following codecs are supported:

- MPEG-2
- VC-1
- H.264 (AVC)
- H.265 (HEVC)
- VP8
- VP9
- AV1

== Versions ==
NVCUVID was originally distributed as part of the Nvidia CUDA Toolkit. Later, it was renamed to NVDEC and moved to the Nvidia Video Codec SDK.

== Operating system support ==
NVDEC is available for Windows and Linux operating systems. As NVDEC is a proprietary API (as opposed to the open-source VDPAU API), it is only supported by the proprietary Nvidia driver on Linux.

== Application and library support ==
- Gstreamer has supported NVDEC since 2017.
- FFmpeg has supported NVDEC since 2017.
- mpv has supported NVDEC since 2017 by the use of FFmpeg.

== GPU support ==
Hardware accelerated decode and encode are supported on Nvidia GeForce, Quadro, Tesla, and GRID products with Fermi or newer generation GPUs.

| Board | Chip | NVDEC per chip | MPEG-2 | VC-1 | VP8 | VP9 | | | H.264 (AVCHD) (except High 10) | H.265 (HEVC) 4:2:0 | | | H.265 (HEVC) 4:2:2 | | | H.265 (HEVC) 4:4:4 | | | AV1 4:2:0 | |
| Board | Chip | NVDEC per chip | MPEG-2 | VC-1 | VP8 | 8 bit | 10 bit | 12 bit | H.264 (AVCHD) (except High 10) | 8 bit | 10 bit | 12 bit | 8 bit | 10 bit | 12 bit | 8 bit | 10 bit | 12 bit | 8 bit | 10 bit |
|---|---|---|---|---|---|---|---|---|---|---|---|---|---|---|---|---|---|---|---|---|
| GeForce 710A > 810A | GK208 | 1 | Yes | Yes | No | No | No | No | Yes | No | No | No | No | No | No | No | No | No | No | No |
| GeForce GT 723A / 740A | GK208 | 1 | Yes | Yes | No | No | No | No | Yes | No | No | No | No | No | No | No | No | No | No | No |
| GeForce GT 720M > 740M | GK208 | 1 | Yes | Yes | No | No | No | No | Yes | No | No | No | No | No | No | No | No | No | No | No |
| GeForce GT 630 / 635/ 640 / 710 / 730 | GK208 | 1 | Yes | Yes | No | No | No | No | Yes | No | No | No | No | No | No | No | No | No | No | No |
| GeForce 710A / 810M / 820M | GK107 | 1 | Yes | Yes | No | No | No | No | Yes | No | No | No | No | No | No | No | No | No | No | No |
| GeForce GT 640M > 755M / GTX 660M | GK107 | 1 | Yes | Yes | No | No | No | No | Yes | No | No | No | No | No | No | No | No | No | No | No |
| GeForce GT 630 - 640 GeForce GTX 650 GeForce GT 740 | GK107 | 1 | Yes | Yes | No | No | No | No | Yes | No | No | No | No | No | No | No | No | No | No | No |
| GeForce GTX 645 -650 Ti Boost GeForce GT 740 | GK106 | 1 | Yes | Yes | No | No | No | No | Yes | No | No | No | No | No | No | No | No | No | No | No |
| GeForce GTX 660 - 690 GeForce GTX 760 - 770 | GK104 | 1 | Yes | Yes | No | No | No | No | Yes | No | No | No | No | No | No | No | No | No | No | No |
| GeForce GTX 760A/M > 880M | GK104 | 1 | Yes | Yes | No | No | No | No | Yes | No | No | No | No | No | No | No | No | No | No | No |
| GeForce GTX 680M/MX > 880M | GK104 | 1 | Yes | Yes | No | No | No | No | Yes | No | No | No | No | No | No | No | No | No | No | No |
| GeForce GTX 780 - 780 Ti | GK110 | 1 | Yes | Yes | No | No | No | No | Yes | No | No | No | No | No | No | No | No | No | No | No |
| GeForce GTX Titan / Titan Black | GK110 | 1 | Yes | Yes | No | No | No | No | Yes | No | No | No | No | No | No | No | No | No | No | No |
| GeForce GTX Titan Z | GK110 | 1 | Yes | Yes | No | No | No | No | Yes | No | No | No | No | No | No | No | No | No | No | No |
| GeForce GTX 745 - 750 Ti | GM107 | 1 | Yes | Yes | No | No | No | No | Yes | No | No | No | No | No | No | No | No | No | No | No |
| GeForce 840M / 845M / 940M / 940MX / 945M / 950M | GM107 | 1 | Yes | Yes | No | No | No | No | Yes | No | No | No | No | No | No | No | No | No | No | No |
| GeForce GTX 850A > 960A | GM107 | 1 | Yes | Yes | No | No | No | No | Yes | No | No | No | No | No | No | No | No | No | No | No |
| GeForce GTX 850M > 960M | GM107 | 1 | Yes | Yes | No | No | No | No | Yes | No | No | No | No | No | No | No | No | No | No | No |
| GeForce 830A > 945A | GM108 | 0 | No | No | No | No | No | No | No | No | No | No | No | No | No | No | No | No | No | No |
| GeForce 830M > 945M | GM108 | 0 | No | No | No | No | No | No | No | No | No | No | No | No | No | No | No | No | No | No |
| GeForce GTX 920MX - 940MX | GM108 | 0 | No | No | No | No | No | No | No | No | No | No | No | No | No | No | No | No | No | No |
| GeForce MX110 / MX130 | GM108 | 0 | No | No | No | No | No | No | No | No | No | No | No | No | No | No | No | No | No | No |
| GeForce GTX 750 / 950 - 960 | GM206 | 1 | Yes | Yes | Yes | Yes | No | No | Yes | Yes | Yes | No | No | No | No | No | No | No | No | No |
| GeForce GTX 965M | GM206 | 1 | Yes | Yes | Yes | Yes | No | No | Yes | Yes | Yes | No | No | No | No | No | No | No | No | No |
| GeForce GTX 910M / 920M / 920A | GM208B | 1 | Yes | Yes | No | No | No | No | Yes | No | No | No | No | No | No | No | No | No | No | No |
| GeForce GTX 980M / 980MX | GM204 | 1 | Yes | Yes | Yes | No | No | No | Yes | No | No | No | No | No | No | No | No | No | No | No |
| GeForce GTX 960 Ti / 970 / 980 | GM204 | 1 | Yes | Yes | Yes | No | No | No | Yes | No | No | No | No | No | No | No | No | No | No | No |
| GeForce GTX 980 Ti | GM200 | 1 | Yes | Yes | Yes | No | No | No | Yes | No | No | No | No | No | No | No | No | No | No | No |
| GeForce GTX Titan X | GM200 | 1 | Yes | Yes | Yes | No | No | No | Yes | No | No | No | No | No | No | No | No | No | No | No |
| GeForce MX150 | GP108 | 0 | No | No | No | No | No | No | No | No | No | No | No | No | No | No | No | No | No | No |
| GeForce MX230 / MX250 / MX330 | GP108 | 0 | No | No | No | No | No | No | No | No | No | No | No | No | No | No | No | No | No | No |
| GeForce GT 1030 | GP108 | 1 | Yes | Yes | No | Yes | Yes | Yes | Yes | Yes | Yes | Yes | No | No | No | No | No | No | No | No |
| GeForce GTX 1050 / 1050 Ti / MX350 | GP107 | 1 | Yes | Yes | No | Yes | Yes | Yes | Yes | Yes | Yes | Yes | No | No | No | No | No | No | No | No |
| GeForce GTX 1050 / 1050 Ti | GP106 | 1 | Yes | Yes | No | Yes | No | No | Yes | Yes | Yes | Yes | No | No | No | No | No | No | No | No |
| GeForce GTX 1060 | GP106 | 1 | Yes | Yes | No | Yes | No | No | Yes | Yes | Yes | Yes | No | No | No | No | No | No | No | No |
| GeForce GTX 1060 | GP104 | 1 | Yes | Yes | No | Yes | No | No | Yes | Yes | Yes | Yes | No | No | No | No | No | No | No | No |
| GeForce GTX 1070M / 1080M | GP104B | 1 | Yes | Yes | Yes | Yes | No | No | Yes | Yes | Yes | Yes | No | No | No | No | No | No | No | No |
| GeForce GTX 1070 / 1070 Ti / 1080 | GP104 | 1 | Yes | Yes | Yes | Yes | No | No | Yes | Yes | Yes | Yes | No | No | No | No | No | No | No | No |
| GeForce GTX 1080 Ti | GP102 | 1 | Yes | Yes | No | Yes | Yes | Yes | Yes | Yes | Yes | Yes | No | No | No | No | No | No | No | No |
| GeForce GTX Titan X / Titan Xp | GP102 | 1 | Yes | Yes | No | Yes | Yes | Yes | Yes | Yes | Yes | Yes | No | No | No | No | No | No | No | No |
| Titan V | GV100 | 1 | Yes | Yes | Yes | Yes | Yes | Yes | Yes | Yes | Yes | Yes | No | No | No | No | No | No | No | No |
| GeForce GTX 1650 / MX450 | TU117 | 1 | Yes | Yes | Yes | Yes | Yes | Yes | Yes | Yes | Yes | Yes | No | No | No | Yes | Yes | Yes | No | No |
| GeForce GTX 1660 Ti / 1660 / 1660 Super | TU116 | 1 | Yes | Yes | Yes | Yes | Yes | Yes | Yes | Yes | Yes | Yes | No | No | No | Yes | Yes | Yes | No | No |
| GeForce RTX 2060 / 2070 / 2060 Super | TU106 | 1 | Yes | Yes | Yes | Yes | Yes | Yes | Yes | Yes | Yes | Yes | No | No | No | Yes | Yes | Yes | No | No |
| GeForce RTX 2080 / 2070 Super / 2080 Super | TU104 | 1 | Yes | Yes | Yes | Yes | Yes | Yes | Yes | Yes | Yes | Yes | No | No | No | Yes | Yes | Yes | No | No |
| GeForce RTX 2080 Ti | TU102 | 1 | Yes | Yes | Yes | Yes | Yes | Yes | Yes | Yes | Yes | Yes | No | No | No | Yes | Yes | Yes | No | No |
| Titan RTX | TU102 | 1 | Yes | Yes | Yes | Yes | Yes | Yes | Yes | Yes | Yes | Yes | No | No | No | Yes | Yes | Yes | No | No |
| A100 | GA100 | 1 | Yes | Yes | Yes | Yes | Yes | Yes | Yes | Yes | Yes | Yes | No | No | No | Yes | Yes | Yes | No | No |
| GeForce RTX 3050 Ti / RTX 3050 | GA107 | 1 | Yes | Yes | Yes | Yes | Yes | Yes | Yes | Yes | Yes | Yes | No | No | No | Yes | Yes | Yes | Yes | Yes |
| GeForce RTX 3060 | GA106 | 1 | Yes | Yes | Yes | Yes | Yes | Yes | Yes | Yes | Yes | Yes | No | No | No | Yes | Yes | Yes | Yes | Yes |
| GeForce RTX 3060 Ti / 3070 / 3070 Ti | GA104 | 1 | Yes | Yes | Yes | Yes | Yes | Yes | Yes | Yes | Yes | Yes | No | No | No | Yes | Yes | Yes | Yes | Yes |
| GeForce RTX 3080 / 3090 | GA102 | 1 | Yes | Yes | Yes | Yes | Yes | Yes | Yes | Yes | Yes | Yes | No | No | No | Yes | Yes | Yes | Yes | Yes |
| GeForce RTX 4090 | AD102 | 1 | Yes | Yes | Yes | Yes | Yes | Yes | Yes | Yes | Yes | Yes | No | No | No | Yes | Yes | Yes | Yes | Yes |
| GeForce RTX 5070 Ti | GB203 | 1 | Yes | Yes | Yes | Yes | Yes | Yes | Yes | Yes | Yes | Yes | Yes | Yes | Yes | Yes | Yes | Yes | Yes | Yes |
| GeForce RTX 5080 | GB203 | 2 | Yes | Yes | Yes | Yes | Yes | Yes | Yes | Yes | Yes | Yes | Yes | Yes | Yes | Yes | Yes | Yes | Yes | Yes |
| GeForce RTX 5090 | GB202 | 2 | Yes | Yes | Yes | Yes | Yes | Yes | Yes | Yes | Yes | Yes | Yes | Yes | Yes | Yes | Yes | Yes | Yes | Yes |
| Board | Chip | NVDEC per chip | MPEG-2 | VC-1 | VP8 | VP9 | | | H.264 (AVCHD) | H.265 (HEVC) 4:2:0 | | | H.265 (HEVC) 4:2:2 | | | H.265 (HEVC) 4:4:4 | | | AV1 4:2:0 | |
| Board | Chip | NVDEC per chip | MPEG-2 | VC-1 | VP8 | 8 bit | 10 bit | 12 bit | H.264 (AVCHD) | 8 bit | 10 bit | 12 bit | 8 bit | 10 bit | 12 bit | 8 bit | 10 bit | 12 bit | 8 bit | 10 bit |

== See also ==
- AMD Video Core Next, AMD's equivalent SIP core since 2018
- AMD Unified Video Decoder, AMD's equivalent SIP core up to 2017
- Intel Quick Sync Video, Intel's equivalent SIP core
- List of Nvidia graphics processing units
- Qualcomm Hexagon
- Nvidia NVENC
