= Cray Urika-GD =

Graph discovery appliance produced by Cray

The Cray Urika-GD is a graph discovery application developed by Cray. It is used to find and analyze relationships and patterns in data collected within a supercomputer.

The Cray Urika-GD generates graphs based on large amounts of data, often from multiple sources, and makes connections among those data. Many organizations now have vast stores of information like this—called "big data"—that they can analyze and use to improve their operations, products or services.

One example of the appliance in use would be a healthcare organization that helps to find, among its 13 million patient records, information that doctors could use to develop treatment plans. By categorizing records based on illness, age, treatment, and outcome, the appliance can provide insights for treating other patients.

“Big data” is also being tapped in professional sports. In 2014, Cray revealed that a Major League Baseball team was using a Urika-GD appliance to graph and analyze its own performance statistics.
