= Non-uniform memory access =

Computer memory design used in multiprocessing

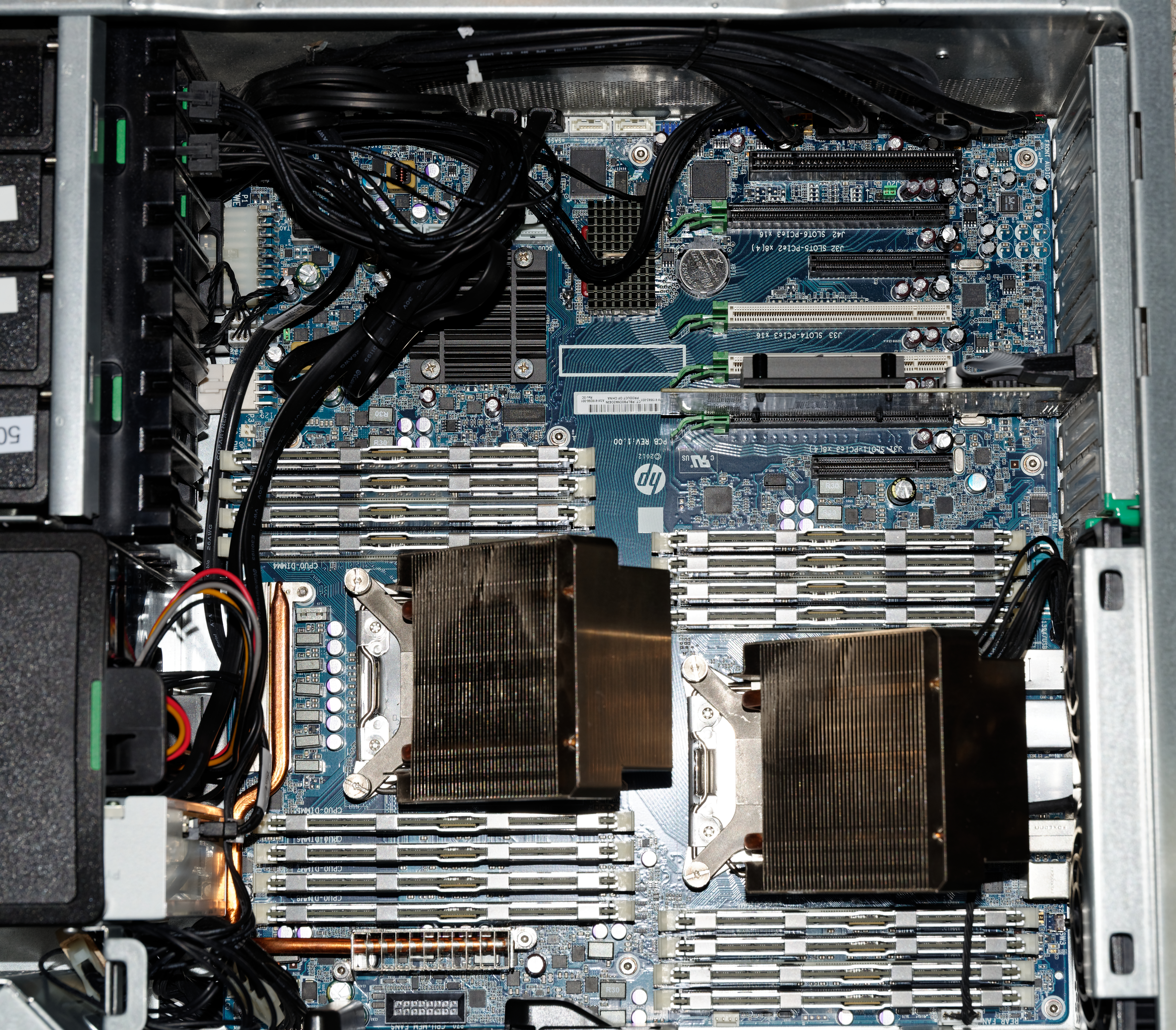
The motherboard of an HP Z820 workstation with two CPU sockets, each with their own set of eight DIMM slots surrounding the socket

Non-uniform memory access (NUMA) is a computer memory design used in multiprocessing, where the memory access time depends on the memory location relative to the processor. Under NUMA, a processor can access its own local memory faster than non-local memory (memory local to another processor or memory shared between processors). NUMA is beneficial for workloads with high memory locality of reference and low lock contention, because a processor may operate on a subset of memory mostly or entirely within its own cache node, reducing traffic on the memory bus.

NUMA architectures logically follow in scaling from symmetric multiprocessing (SMP) architectures. They were developed commercially during the 1990s by Unisys, Convex Computer (later Hewlett-Packard), Honeywell Information Systems Italy (HISI) (later Groupe Bull), Silicon Graphics (later Silicon Graphics International), Sequent Computer Systems (later IBM), Data General (later EMC, now Dell Technologies), Digital (later Compaq, then HP, now HPE) and ICL. Techniques developed by these companies later featured in a variety of Unix-like operating systems, and to an extent in Windows NT.

The first commercial implementation of a NUMA-based Unix system was the Symmetrical Multi Processing XPS-100 family of servers, designed by Dan Gielan of VAST Corporation for Honeywell Information Systems Italy.

== Overview ==
One possible architecture of a NUMA system. The processors connect to the bus or crossbar by connections of varying number. This shows that different CPUs have different access priorities to memory based on their relative location.

Modern CPUs operate considerably faster than the main memory they use. In the early days of computing and data processing, the CPU generally ran slower than its own memory. The performance lines of processors and memory crossed in the 1960s with the advent of the first supercomputers. Since then, CPUs increasingly have found themselves "starved for data" and forced to stall to wait for data to arrive from memory (e.g. for Von-Neumann architecture-based computers, see Von Neumann bottleneck). Many supercomputer designs of the 1980s and 1990s focused on providing high-speed memory access as opposed to faster processors, allowing the computers to work on large data sets at speeds other systems could not approach.

Limiting the number of memory accesses provided the key to extracting high performance from a modern computer. For commodity processors, this meant installing an ever-increasing amount of high-speed cache memory and using increasingly sophisticated algorithms to avoid cache misses. But the dramatic increase in size of both the operating systems and the applications that run on them has generally overwhelmed these cache-processing improvements. Multi-processor systems without NUMA make the problem considerably worse. Now a system can starve several processors at the same time, notably because only one processor can access the computer's memory at a time.

NUMA attempts to address this problem by providing separate memory for each processor, avoiding the performance hit when several processors attempt to address the same memory. For problems involving spread data (common for servers and similar applications), NUMA can improve the performance over a single shared memory by a factor of roughly the number of processors (or separate memory banks). Another approach to addressing this problem is the multi-channel memory architecture, in which a linear increase in the number of memory channels increases the memory access concurrency linearly.

Of course, not all data ends up confined to a single task, which means that more than one processor may require the same data. To handle these cases, NUMA systems include additional hardware or software to move data between memory banks. This operation slows the processors attached to those banks, so the overall speed increase due to NUMA heavily depends on the nature of the running tasks.

== Implementations ==
AMD implemented NUMA with its Opteron processor (2003), using HyperTransport. Intel announced NUMA compatibility for its x86 and Itanium servers in late 2007 with its Nehalem and Tukwila CPUs. Both Intel CPU families share a common chipset; the interconnection is called Intel QuickPath Interconnect (QPI), which provides extremely high bandwidth to enable high on-board scalability and was replaced by a new version called Intel UltraPath Interconnect with the release of Skylake (2017).

== Cache coherent NUMA (ccNUMA) ==
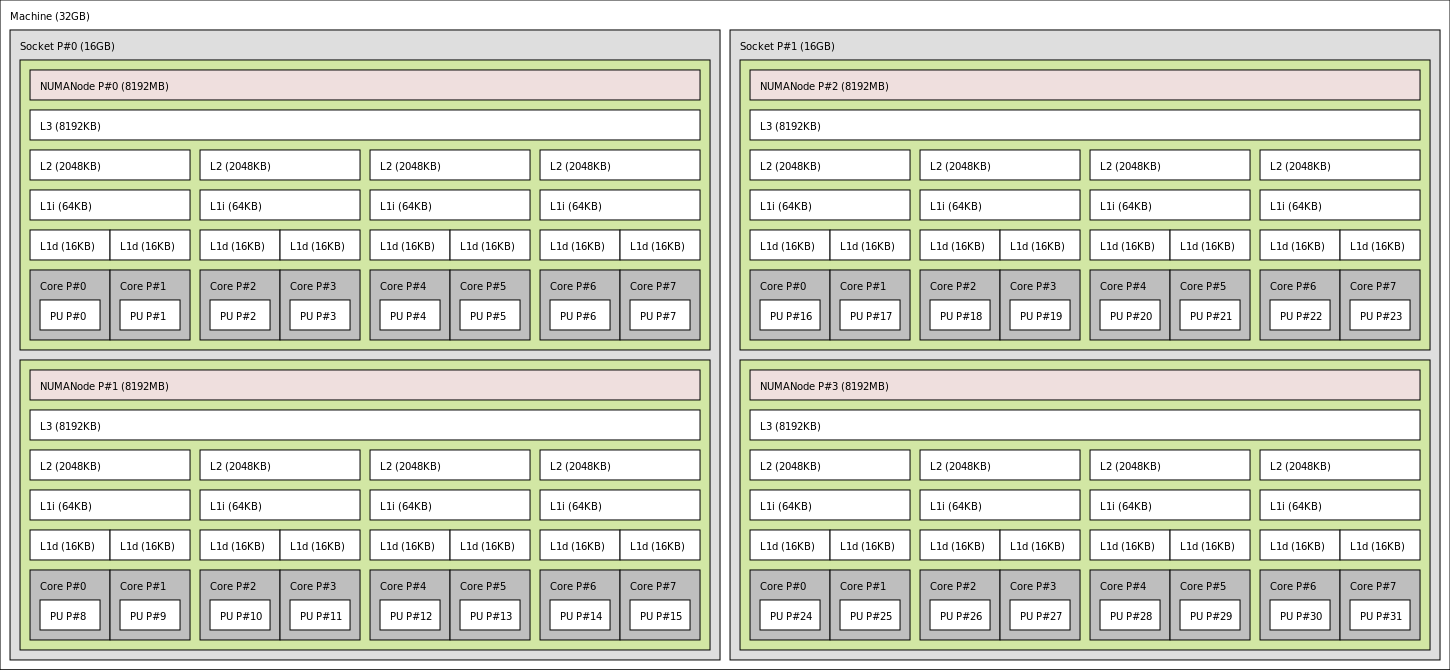
Topology of a ccNUMA Bulldozer server, extracted using hwloc's lstopo tool

Nearly all CPU architectures use a small amount of very fast non-shared memory known as cache to exploit locality of reference in memory accesses. With NUMA, maintaining cache coherence across shared memory has a significant overhead. Although simpler to design and build, non-cache-coherent NUMA systems become prohibitively complex to program in the standard von Neumann architecture programming model.

Typically, ccNUMA uses inter-processor communication between cache controllers to keep a consistent memory image when more than one cache stores the same memory location. For this reason, ccNUMA may perform poorly when multiple processors attempt to access the same memory area in rapid succession. Support for NUMA in operating systems attempts to reduce the frequency of this kind of access by allocating processors and memory in NUMA-friendly ways and by avoiding scheduling and locking algorithms that make NUMA-unfriendly accesses necessary.

Alternatively, cache coherency protocols such as the MESIF protocol attempt to reduce the communication required to maintain cache coherency. Scalable Coherent Interface (SCI) is an IEEE standard defining a directory-based cache coherency protocol to avoid scalability limitations found in earlier multiprocessor systems. For example, SCI is used as the basis for the NumaConnect technology.

== NUMA vs. cluster computing ==
One can view NUMA as a tightly coupled form of cluster computing. The addition of virtual memory paging to a cluster architecture can allow the implementation of NUMA entirely in software. However, the inter-node latency of software-based NUMA remains several orders of magnitude greater (slower) than that of hardware-based NUMA.

== Software support ==
Since NUMA largely influences memory access performance, certain software optimizations are needed to allow scheduling threads and processes close to their in-memory data.

- Microsoft Windows 7 and Windows Server 2008 R2 added support for NUMA architecture over 64 logical cores.
- Java 7 added support for NUMA-aware memory allocator and garbage collector.
- Linux kernel:
  - Version 2.5 provided a basic NUMA support, which was further improved in subsequent kernel releases.
  - Version 3.8 of the Linux kernel brought a new NUMA foundation that allowed development of more efficient NUMA policies in later kernel releases.
  - Version 3.13 of the Linux kernel brought numerous policies that aim at putting a process near its memory, together with the handling of cases such as having memory pages shared between processes, or the use of transparent huge pages; new sysctl settings allow NUMA balancing to be enabled or disabled, as well as the configuration of various NUMA memory balancing parameters.
- OpenSolaris models NUMA architecture with lgroups.
- FreeBSD added support for NUMA architecture in version 9.0.
- Silicon Graphics IRIX (discontinued as of 2013) support for ccNUMA architecture over 1240 CPU with Origin server series.

== Hardware support ==
As of 2011, ccNUMA systems are multiprocessor systems based on the AMD Opteron processor, which can be implemented without external logic, and the Intel Itanium processor, which requires the chipset to support NUMA. Examples of ccNUMA-enabled chipsets are the SGI Shub (Super hub), the Intel E8870, the HP sx2000 (used in the Integrity and Superdome servers), and those found in NEC Itanium-based systems. Earlier ccNUMA systems such as those from Silicon Graphics were based on MIPS processors and the DEC Alpha 21364 (EV7) processor.

== See also ==
- Cache-only memory architecture (COMA)
- CAS latency – Time delay between data read command and availability of data in a computer's RAM
- HiperDispatch
- Nodal architecture – Computer series from British company ICL
- Partitioned global address space – Parallel programming model paradigm in computer science
- Scratchpad memory (SPM)
- Uniform memory access (UMA)
