= DataCore =

American software-designed storage developer

- Type: Private
- Industry: Data storage
- Founded: February 1998
- Founder: George Teixeira
- Headquarters: 1901 Cypress Creek Road, Suite 200, Ft. Lauderdale, Florida 33309, USA
- Key people: Dave Zabrowski, CEO; George Teixeira, Executive Chairman
- Products: Software-defined storage, storage virtualization, hyper-converged infrastructure, object storage, file system
- Website: datacore.com

DataCore, also known as DataCore Software, is a developer of software-defined storage based in Fort Lauderdale, Florida, United States. The company is a pioneer in the development of SAN virtualization technology, and offers software-defined storage for block, file, and object storage across core data center, edge and cloud environments.

== History ==
DataCore was founded in Fort Lauderdale in February 1998 by George Teixeira and Ziya Aral, co-workers at parallel computing company Encore Computer. The premise behind the company was to allow network operators to purchase commodity disk drives, external storage arrays or SAN disk drive arrays, and treat them all as virtual disks of networked, block-access storage. This storage was controlled using DataCore software.

They were joined by 10 other former Encore colleagues, and they all worked without pay until January 1999, when the company secured its first funding round, of US$8 million.

In 2000, the company had a $35 million Series C funding round.

In 2006, seeing an exodus of venture funding, company employees mortgaged their homes to keep the business going, until 2008 when a $30 million round of funding stabilized company finances.

In 2011, the company launched SANsymphony-V, an upgrade to its storage virtualization software offering faster performance.

In 2016, the company's SANsymphony-V software was reported to have set new price performance records based on testing done by Redwood City, California–based non-profit testing company Storage Performance Council using their SPC-1 storage performance benchmark.

In April 2018 DataCore announced that Dave Zabrowski, previously CEO of cloud-based financial services company Cloud Cruiser, was its new CEO, and former CEO George Teixeira was named Executive Chairman.

In February 2020, DataCore, together with AME Cloud Ventures and Insight Partners, invested $26 million in Palo Alto–based MayaData. In the same month, DataCore launched a global research and development center in Bangalore, India.

In January 2021, DataCore acquired Caringo, Inc., enabling the company to offer object storage solutions. DataCore announced the global availability of DataCore Swarm object storage software in April 2021 as a result of the acquisition. In November 2021, DataCore acquired MayaData, the original developer of cloud-native storage platform OpenEBS and Mayastor.

In January 2023, DataCore acquired Object Matrix, an object storage supplier focused on the media and entertainment industry.

In April 2023, DataCore introduced a new division of the company, Perifery, with a focus on storage and workflow solutions for the media and entertainment industry.

In October 2023, DataCore acquired Workflow Intelligence Nexus (WIN) to strengthen its Perifery division with AI-driven workflow automation. WIN’s technology powers Perifery AI+, enabling metadata generation, transcription, facial and object recognition, automated translation and other AI-enabled services for media content management and monetization.

In July 2024, DataCore secured $60 million in funding from Vistara Growth, which will support the expansion of its technology portfolio and operations, investment in emerging technologies like AI and cybersecurity, and enhancements to its storage solutions.

In February 2025, DataCore acquired Arcastream's file system business from Kalray Inc., enabling it to provide high-performance file storage for data-intensive workloads, including AI and HPC and subsequently released the technology as DataCore Nexus. This acquisition also brought together Perifery and Arcastream's media division under a unified brand—Pixitmedia focused on solutions for the media and entertainment industry.

In May 2025, DataCore acquired StarWind Software, extending hyperconverged infrastructure capabilities to the edge, ROBO, and SMB markets.

In January 2026, DataCore introduced Puls8, a container-native persistent storage platform for stateful workloads in Kubernetes environments.

In March 2026, DataCore launched Swarm Appliance, a turnkey object storage appliance for data protection, archiving, and long-term data retention in edge and ROBO environments.
