= Zero ASIC =

American semiconductor company

Zero ASIC Corporation
- Formerly: Adapteva, Inc.
- Industry: Semiconductor industry
- Founded: March 2008
- Founder: Andreas Olofsson
- Headquarters: Lexington, Massachusetts, US
- Key people: Andreas Olofsson, CEO
- Products: Central processing units
- Owner: Privately funded
- Website: zeroasic.com

Zero ASIC Corporation, formerly Adapteva, Inc., is a fabless semiconductor company focusing on low power many core microprocessor design. The company was the second company to announce a design with 1,000 specialized processing cores on a single integrated circuit.

Adapteva was founded in 2008 with the goal of bringing a ten times advancement in floating-point performance per watt for the mobile device market. Products are based on its Epiphany multi-core multiple instruction, multiple data (MIMD) architecture and its Parallella Kickstarter project promoting "a supercomputer for everyone" in September 2012. The company's original name, Adapteva, is a combination of "adapt" and the Hebrew word "Teva" meaning nature.

Sometime before October 2023 the company was renamed to Zero ASIC, with a distinct focus on chiplet-based products and FPGA design tools.

== History ==
Adapteva was founded in March 2008, by Andreas Olofsson. The company was founded with the goal of bringing a 10× advancement in floating-point processing energy efficiency for the mobile device market. In May 2009, Olofsson had a prototype of a new type of massively parallel multi-core computer architecture. The initial prototype was implemented in 65 nm and had 16 independent microprocessor cores. The initial prototypes enabled Adapteva to secure US$1.5 million in series-A funding from BittWare, a company from Concord, New Hampshire, in October 2009.

Adapteva's first commercial chip product started sampling to customers in early May 2011 and they soon thereafter announced the capability to put up to 4,096 cores on a single chip.

The Epiphany III, was announced in October 2011 using 28 nm and 65 nm manufacturing processes.

== Products ==
=== Epiphany CPUs ===
Adapteva's main product family is the Epiphany scalable multi-core MIMD architecture. The Epiphany architecture could accommodate chips with up to 4,096 RISC out-of-order microprocessors, all sharing a single 32-bit flat memory space. Each RISC processor in the Epiphany architecture is superscalar with 64× 32-bit unified register file (integer or single-precision) microprocessor operating up to 1 GHz and capable of 2 GFLOPS (single-precision). Epiphany's RISC processors use a custom instruction set architecture (ISA) optimised for single-precision floating-point, but are programmable in high level ANSI C using a standard GNU-GCC tool chain. Each RISC processor (in current implementations; not fixed in the architecture) has 32 KB of local memory. Code (possibly duplicated in each core) and stack space should be in that local memory; in addition (most) temporary data should fit there for full speed. Data can also be used from other processor cores local memory at a speed penalty, or off-chip RAM with much larger speed penalty.

The memory architecture does not employ explicit hierarchy of hardware caches, similar to the Sony/Toshiba/IBM Cell processor, but with the additional benefit of off-chip and inter-core loads and stores being supported (which simplifies porting software to the architecture). It is a hardware implementation of partitioned global address space.

This eliminated the need for complex cache coherency hardware, which places a practical limit on the number of cores in a traditional multicore system. The design allows the programmer to leverage greater foreknowledge of independent data access patterns to avoid the runtime cost of figuring this out. All processor nodes are connected through a network on chip, allowing efficient message passing.

==== Scalability ====
The architecture is designed to scale almost indefinitely, with 4 e-links allowing multiple chips to be combined in a grid topology, allowing for systems with thousands of cores.

==== Coprocessors ====
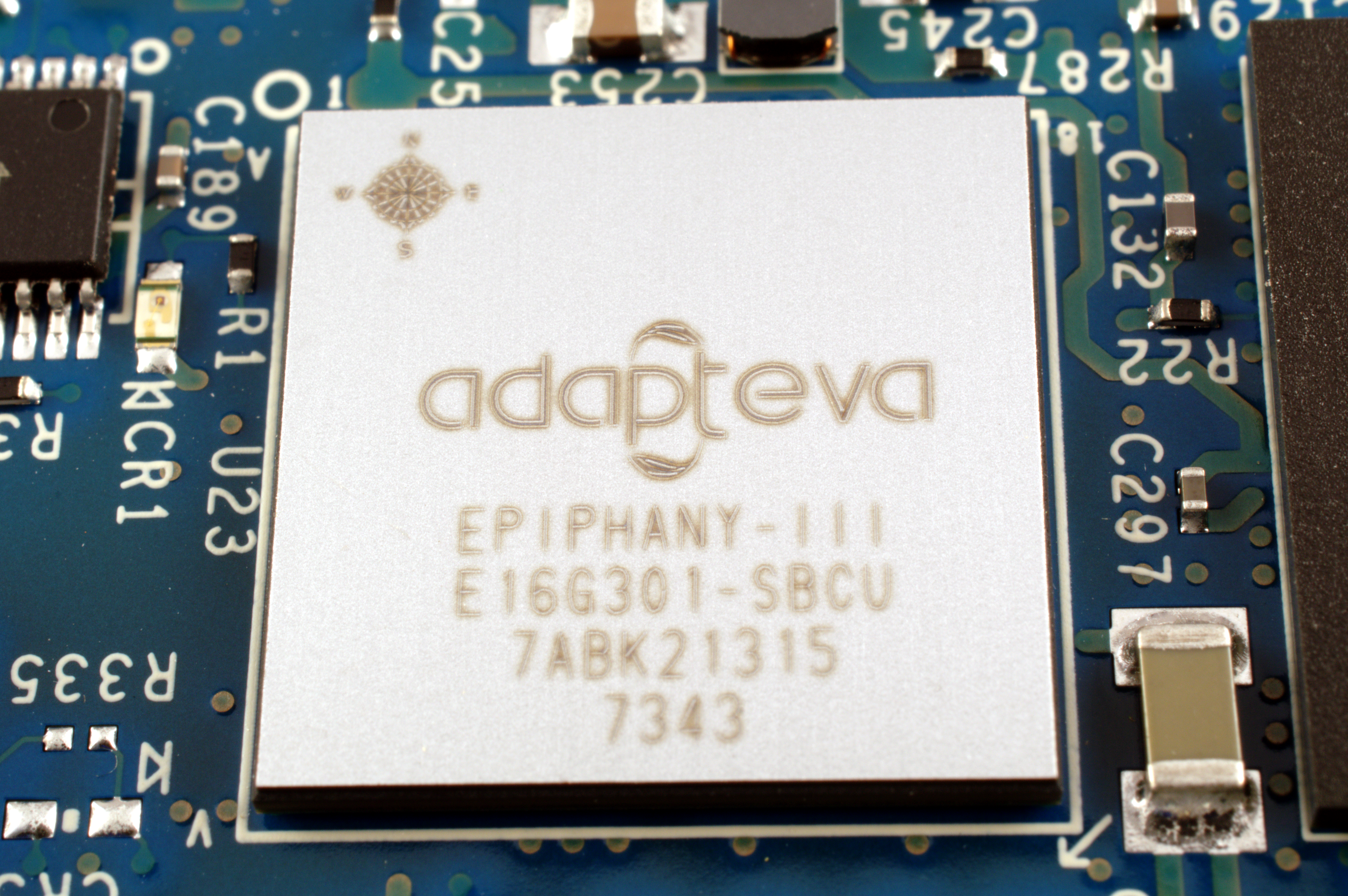
16-core Adapteva Epiphany chip, E16G301, from Parallella single-board computer

On August 19, 2012, Adapteva posted some specifications and information about Epiphany multi-core coprocessors.

Technical info for	E16G301	E64G401
Cores	16	64
Core MHz	1000	800
Core GFLOPS	2	1.6
"Sum GHz"	16	51.2
Sum GFLOPS	32	102
mm^{2}	8.96	8.2
nm	65	28
W def.	0.9	1.4
W max.	2	2

In September 2012, a 16-core version, the Epiphany-III (E16G301), was produced using 65 nm (11.5 mm^{2}, 500 MHz chip) and engineering samples of 64-core Epiphany-IV (E64G401) were produced using 28 nm GlobalFoundries process (800 MHz).

The primary markets for the Epiphany multi-core architecture include:

- Smartphone applications such as real-time facial recognition, speech recognition, translation, and augmented reality.
- Next generation supercomputers requiring drastically better energy efficiency to allow systems to scale to exaflop computing levels.
- Floating-point acceleration in embedded systems based on field-programmable gate array architectures.

==== Parallella project ====
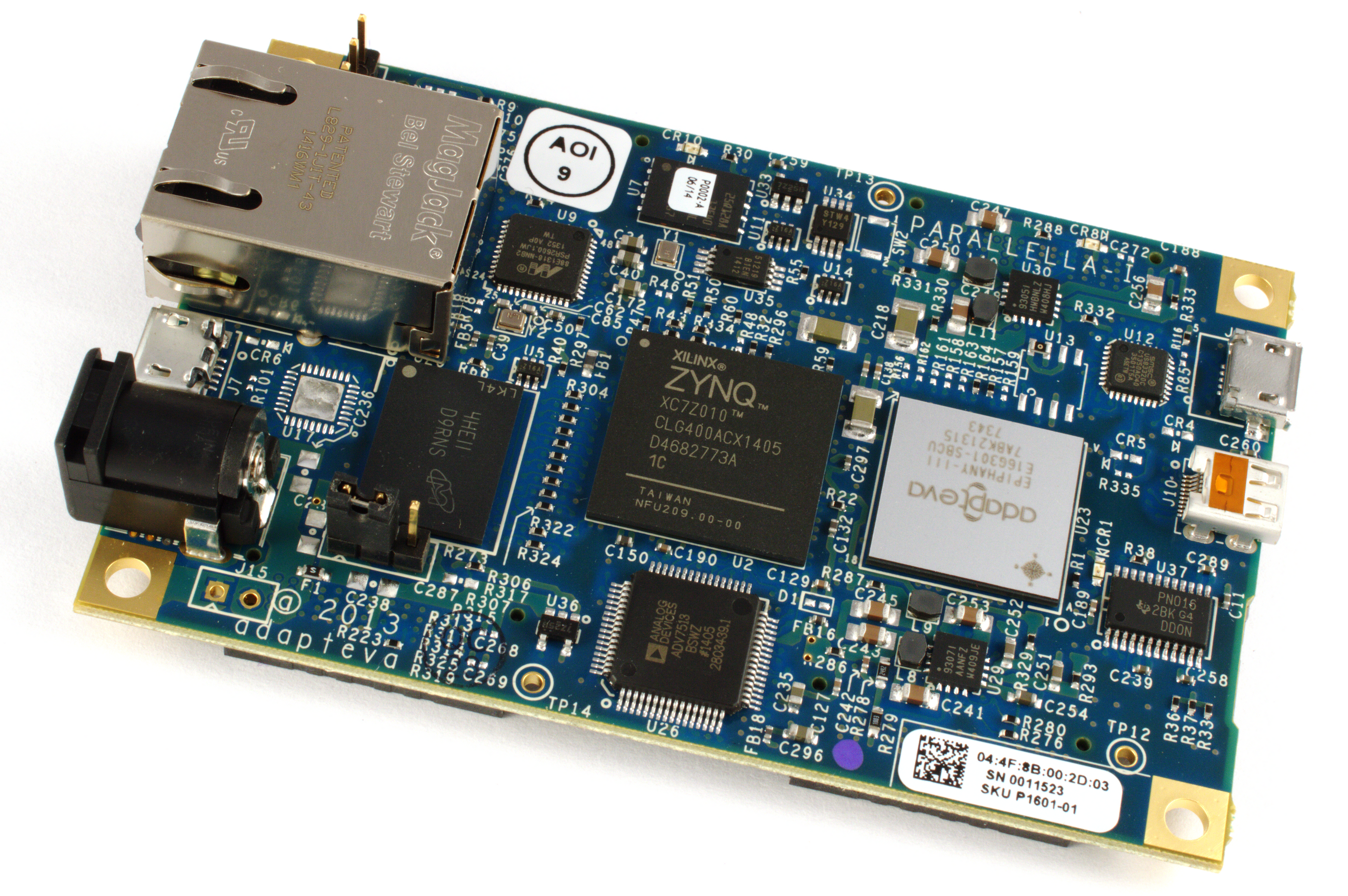
Parallella single-board computer with 16-core Epiphany chip and Zynq-7010 FPGA

In September 2012, Adapteva started project Parallella on Kickstarter, which was marketed as "A Supercomputer for everyone." Architecture reference manuals for the platform were published as part of the campaign to attract attention to the project. The US$750,000 funding goal was reached in a month, with a minimum contribution of US$99 entitling backers to obtain one device; although the initial deadline was set for May 2013, the first single-board computers with 16-core Epiphany chip were finally shipped in December 2013.

Size of board is planned to be 86 mm × 53 mm (3.4 in × 2.1 in).

The Kickstarter campaign raised US$898,921. Raising US$3 million goal was unsuccessful, so no 64-core version of Parallella will be mass-produced. Kickstarter users having donated more than US$750 will get "parallella-64" variant with 64-core coprocessor (made from initial prototype manufacturing with 50 chips yield per wafer).

	Parallella-16 Micro Server	Parallella-16 Desktop Computer	Parallella-16 Embedded Platform
Usage	Ethernet connected headless server	A personal computer	Leading edge embedded systems
Processor	Dual-core 32-bit ARM Cortex-A9 with NEON at 1 GHz (part of Zynq XC7Z010 chip by Xilinx)		Dual-core 32-bit ARM Cortex-A9 with NEON at 1 GHz (part of Zynq XC7Z020 chip by Xilinx)
Coprocessor	16-core Epiphany III multi-core accelerator (E16)		
Memory	1 GB DDR3L RAM		
Ethernet	10/100/1000		
USB	—N/a	2× USB 2.0 (USB 2.0 HS and USB OTG)	
Display	—N/a	HDMI	
Storage	16 GB microSD		
Expansion	—N/a	2 eLinks + 24 GPIO	2 eLinks + 24 GPIO
FPGA	28K programmable logic cells 80 programmable DSP slices		80K programmable logic cells 220 programmable DSP slices
Weight	36 g (1.3 oz)	38 g (1.3 oz)	
Size	3.5 in × 2.1 in × 0.625 in (88.9 mm × 53.3 mm × 15.9 mm)		
SKU	P1600-DK-xx	P1601-DK-xx	P1602-DK-xx
HTS Code	8471.41.0150		
Power	USB-powered (2.5 W) or 5 V DC (≈5 W)		

==== Epiphany V ====
By 2016, the firm had taped out a 1024-core 64-bit variant of their Epiphany architecture that featured: larger local stores (64 KB), 64-bit addressing, double-precision floating-point arithmetic or SIMD single-precision, and 64-bit integer instructions, implemented in the 16 nm process node. This design included instruction set enhancements aimed at deep-learning and cryptography applications. In July 2017, Adapteva's founder became a DARPA MTO program manager and announced that the Epiphany V was "unlikely" to become available as a commercial product.

==== Performance ====
The 16-core Parallella achieves roughly 5.0 GFLOPS/W, and the 64-core Epiphany-IV made with 28 nm estimated as 50 GFLOPS/W (single-precision), and 32-board system based on them achieves 15 GFLOPS/W. For comparison, top GPUs from AMD and Nvidia reached 10 GFLOPS/W for single-precision in 2009–2011 timeframe.

=== ChipMaker ===
In 2023, the company pivoted to chiplet based CPU designs, using RISC-V CPU cores and open source FPGA design tools.

== See also ==
- Asynchronous array of simple processors
- SW26010 – a Chinese design featuring a similar architecture used in the Sunway TaihuLight supercomputer
- Vision Processing Unit – a class of processor with significant overlapping features
