= Manycore processor =

Multi-core processor with a large number of cores

Manycore processors are special kinds of multi-core processors designed for a high degree of parallel processing, containing numerous simpler, independent processor cores (from a few tens of cores to thousands or more). Manycore processors are used extensively in embedded computers and high-performance computing.

== Contrast with multicore architecture ==
Manycore processors are distinct from multi-core processors in being optimized from the outset for a higher degree of explicit parallelism, and for higher throughput (or lower power consumption) at the expense of latency and lower single-thread performance.

The broader category of multi-core processors, by contrast, are usually designed to efficiently run both parallel and serial code, and therefore place more emphasis on high single-thread performance (e.g. devoting more silicon to out-of-order execution, deeper pipelines, more superscalar execution units, and larger, more general caches), and shared memory. These techniques devote runtime resources toward figuring out implicit parallelism in a single thread. They are used in systems where they have evolved continuously (with backward compatibility) from single core processors. They usually have a 'few' cores (e.g. 2, 4, 8) and may be complemented by a manycore accelerator (such as a GPU) in a heterogeneous system.

== Motivation ==
Cache coherency is an issue limiting the scaling of multicore processors. Manycore processors may bypass this with methods such as message passing, scratchpad memory, DMA, partitioned global address space, or read-only/non-coherent caches. A manycore processor using a network on a chip and local memories gives software the opportunity to explicitly optimise the spatial layout of tasks (e.g. as seen in tooling developed for TrueNorth).

Manycore processors may have more in common (conceptually) with technologies originating in high-performance computing such as clusters and vector processors.

GPUs may be considered a form of manycore processor having multiple shader processing units, and only being suitable for highly parallel code (high throughput, but extremely poor single thread performance).

== Programming models ==
- Message passing interface
- OpenCL or other APIs supporting compute kernels
- Partitioned global address space
- Actor model
- OpenMP
- Dataflow

== Classes of manycore systems ==
- GPUs, which can be described as manycore vector processors
- Massively parallel processor array
- Asynchronous array of simple processors
- Spatial architecture

== Specific manycore architectures ==
- ZettaScaler , Japanese PEZY Computing 2,048-core modules
- Xeon Phi coprocessor, which has MIC (Many Integrated Cores) architecture
- Tilera
- Adapteva Epiphany Architecture, a manycore chip using PGAS scratchpad memory
- Coherent Logix hx3100 Processor, a 100-core DSP/GPP processor based on HyperX Architecture
- Movidius Myriad 2, a manycore vision processing unit (VPU)
- Kalray, a manycore PCI-e accelerator for data-intensive tasks
- Teraflops Research Chip, a manycore processor using message passing
- TrueNorth, an AI accelerator with a manycore network on a chip architecture
- Green arrays, a manycore processor using message passing aimed at low power applications
- Sunway SW26010, a 260-core manycore processor used in the then top 1 supercomputer Sunway TaihuLight
  - SW52020, an improved 520-core variant of SW26010, with 512-bit SIMD (also adding support for half-precision), used in a prototype, meant for an exascale system (and in the future 10 exascale system), and according to datacenterdynamics China is rumored to already have two separate exascale systems secretly
- Eyeriss, a manycore processor designed for running convolutional neural nets for embedded vision applications
- Graphcore, a manycore AI accelerator

== Specific manycore computers with 1M+ CPU cores ==
A number of computers built from multicore processors have one million or more individual CPU cores. Examples include:

- Gyoukou (Japanese: 暁光 Hepburn: gyōkō, dawn light), a supercomputer developed by ExaScaler and PEZY Computing, with 20,480,000 processing elements total, in addition to 1,250 Intel Xeon D host processors.
- SpiNNaker, a massively parallel (1 million CPU cores) manycore processor (ARM-based) built as part of the Human Brain Project.

== Specific computers with 5 million or more CPU cores ==
Quite a few supercomputers have over 5 million CPU cores. When there are also coprocessors, e.g. GPUs used with, then those cores are not listed in the core-count, then quite a few more computers would hit those targets.

- Frontier
- Fugaku, a Japanese supercomputer using Fujitsu A64FX ARM-based cores, 7,630,848 in total.
- Sunway TaihuLight, a Chinese supercomputer with 10,649,600 cores across 40,960 nodes. Each node contains an SW26010 processor with 256 computing cores and four management cores. As of June 2026, Sunway TaihuLight ranked 27th on the TOP500 list.

== See also ==
- Vector processor
- SIMD
- High-performance computing
- Computer cluster
- Multiprocessor system on a chip
- Vision processing unit
- Memory access pattern
- Cache coherency
- Embarrassingly parallel
- Massively parallel
- CUDA
