= Mindspeed Technologies =

American semiconductor company

Mindspeed Technologies, Inc.
- Type: Public
- Traded as: Nasdaq: MSPD
- Industry: Semiconductors; Electronics
- Founded: June 27, 2003; 23 years ago
- Headquarters: Newport Beach, California, United States
- Key people: Raouf Y. Halim (president, CEO), Amukurajah Das, Head - India operations, IDC, Hyderabad.
- Products: Integrated Circuits; Wireless networks Mobile communications Network switches Digital subscriber line VoIP crosspoint switches FTTx
- Revenue: $162 million USD (2011)
- Net income: ▲-$0.76 million USD (2011)
- Number of employees: 550 (2012)
- Website: www.mindspeed.com

Mindspeed Technologies, Inc. was an American fabless semiconductor company that designed, manufactured, developed, and sold integrated circuits for communications applications in wireless and wired networks. The company's wireless portfolio was purchased by Intel in 2013.

== Products ==
=== Wireless ===
Mindspeed’s products are used in wireless infrastructure and small cell base-stations. The company's ARM-based processors include low-power, multi-core digital signal processor system-on-chip (SoC) products for fixed and mobile (3G/4G) carrier infrastructure (the Transcede family) and Picochip's SoCs for 3G (HSPA) femtocells and small cells.

Mindspeed announced the Transcede family of wireless baseband processors in 2010, including the single-core Transcede 3000, which serves the eNodeB processing needs of a picocell, while consuming less than 10 watts (W) of power, and the dual-core Transcede 4000, which delivers three sectors of LTE processing for macro cells serving thousands of subscribers. The Transcede 4000 integrates 26 programmable processors into a single device, including two ARM® Cortex A9® multi-core symmetric multiprocessing (SMP) reduced instruction set computer (RISC) processors, 10 CEVA (digital signal processors (DSPs) and 10 DSP accelerators, enabling equipment manufacturers to fully support the complete processing needs of single- and multi-sector base stations using the WCDMA/HSPA, LTE, LTE time-division duplex (TD-LTE), time division synchronous code division multiple access (TD-SCDMA, in China) and other air-interface standards.

The Transcede 4000 processor was honored as the Best Mobile Technology Breakthrough at the 2010 Mobile Excellence Awards.

Following the acquisition of Picochip, that company's small cell SoC products are part of Mindspeed's Wireless Business Unit.

=== Communications convergence processing ===
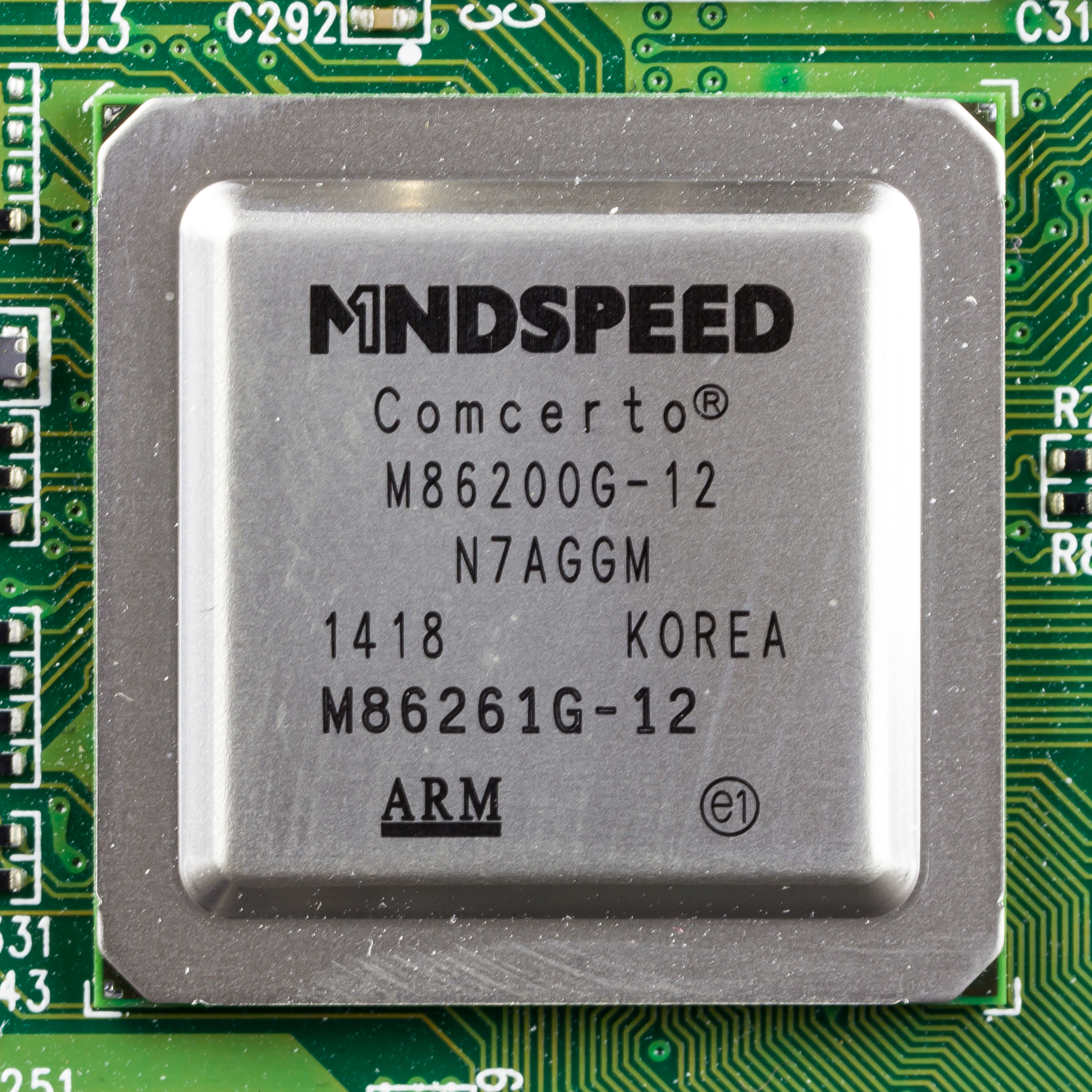
Mindspeed Comcerto M86200G-12, used in WD My Cloud

Mindspeed’s ARM-based products include low-power, multi-core digital signal processor system-on-chip (SoC) for residential and enterprise platforms (the Comcerto Product line) and carrier-grade VoIP systems.

These are embedded packet processors for a wide variety of applications ranging from high-end VoIP enabled home gateways, small-to-midsized business (SMB) security appliances to Ethernet powered 802.11n enterprise access points. The Comcerto family are based on ARM host processors.

Mindspeed announced the new generation of this family, the Comcerto 2000 in June 2012.

=== High-performance analog ===
Analog products include high-density crosspoint switches, optical drivers, equalization and signal-conditioning products. The high-performance analog transmission devices and switching products support storage area network, fiber-to-the-premise, OTN and broadcast video typically operating at data transmission rates between 155 megabits per second (Mbit/s) and 10 gigabits per second (Gbit/s).

The transmission products include laser drivers, transimpedance amplifiers, post amplifiers, clock and data recovery circuits, signal conditioners, serializers/deserializers, video reclockers, cable drivers and line equalizers. These products serve as the connection between a fiber optic or coaxial cable component interface and the remainder of the electrical subsystem in various network equipment.

The switching products include a family of high-speed crosspoint switches capable of switching traffic within network switching equipment. Typical equipment applications for switching products include OTN systems, add-drop multiplexers, high-density IP switches and storage-area routers. In addition, crosspoint switches are used for broadcast video routing and production switching applications.

=== Wide area networking ===
The legacy wide area network communications portfolio includes carrier Ethernet devices, Layer 2 processors, T-carrier and E-carrier devices and symmetric digital subscriber line (SDSL) devices.

== History ==
Mindspeed Technologies was formed from the spin-off of the Network Access division of Conexant Systems, Inc. to shareowners on June 27, 2003; creating two independent, publicly traded communications semiconductor companies.

Conexant Systems was established four years earlier when Rockwell International spun off its Rockwell Semiconductor Systems (RSS) division to shareholders as an independent company focused exclusively on providing semiconductor products for communications electronics. The Network Access division (which became Mindspeed) helped to develop and commercialize 56 kbps client-side and central-site modem technology in the mid- to late-1990s that was used to deploy dial-up Internet access services offered by Internet service providers (ISPs).

As an independent company, Mindspeed used its experience in analog and mixed-signal communications semiconductor technology to create multi-core packet-processing devices for Voice over IP (VoIP) gateways, routers and other communications systems.

In January 2012, Mindspeed acquired British company Picochip for about $52 million.

Mindspeed was acquired by MACOM in November 2013 and Mindspeed Wireless was acquired by Intel in 2013.

== Manufacturing ==
Mindspeed was a Fabless semiconductor company. It outsourced all semiconductor manufacturing to merchant foundries, such as TSMC, Samsung and others.
