= Multicore Association =

Type of non-profit consortium

The Multicore Association was founded in 2005. Multicore Association is a member-funded, non-profit, industry consortium focused on the creation of open standard APIs, specifications, and guidelines that allow system developers and programmers to more readily adopt multicore technology into their applications.

The consortium provides a neutral forum for vendors and developers who are interested in, working with, and/or proliferating multicore-related products, including processors, infrastructure, devices, software, and applications. Its members represent vendors of processors, operating systems, compilers, development tools, debuggers, ESL/EDA tools, and simulators; and application and system developers.

== Completed Projects ==
In 2008, the Multicore Communications API working group released the consortium's first specification, referred to as MCAPI. MCAPI is a message-passing API that captures the basic elements of communication and synchronization that are required for closely distributed (multiple cores on a chip and/or chips on a circuit board) embedded systems. The target systems for MCAPI span multiple dimensions of heterogeneity (e.g., core heterogeneity, interconnect fabric heterogeneity, memory heterogeneity, operating system heterogeneity, software toolchain heterogeneity, and programming language heterogeneity).

In 2011, the MCAPI working group released MCAPI 2.0. The enhanced version adds new features, such as domains for routing purposes. MCAPI Version 2.0 adds a level of hierarchy into that network of nodes through the introduction of "domains". Domains can be used in a variety of implementation-specific ways, such as for representing all the cores on a given chip or for dividing a topology into public and secure areas. MCAPI 2.0 also adds three new types of initialization parameters (node attributes, implementation-specific configurations, implementation information such as the initial network topology or the MCAPI version being executed). The MCAPI WG is chaired by Sven Brehmer.

In 2011, the Multicore Resource Management API working group released its first specification, referred to as MRAPI. MRAPI is an industry-standard API that specifies essential application-level resource management capabilities. Multicore applications require this API to allow coordinated concurrent access to system resources in situations where: (1) there are not enough resources to dedicate to individual tasks or processors, and/or (2) the Run time (program lifecycle phase) system does not provide a uniformly accessible mechanism for coordinating resource sharing. This API is applicable to both SMP and AMP embedded multicore implementations (whereby AMP refers to heterogeneous both in terms of software and hardware). MRAPI (in conjunction with other Multicore Association APIs) can serve as a valuable tool for implementing applications, as well as for implementing such full-featured resource managers and other types of layered services. The MRAPI WG was chaired by Jim Holt.

In 2013, the Multicore Task Management API (MTAPI) working group released its first specification. MTAPI is a standard specification for an application program interface (API) that supports the coordination of tasks on embedded parallel systems with homogeneous and heterogeneous cores. Core features of MTAPI are runtime scheduling and mapping of tasks to processor cores. Due to its dynamic behavior, MTAPI is intended for optimizing throughput on multicore-systems, allowing the software developer to improve the task scheduling strategy for latency and fairness. This working group was chaired by Urs Gleim of Siemens.

In 2013, the Multicore Programming Practices (MPP) working group delivered a multicore software programming guide for the industry that aids in improving consistency and understanding of multicore programming issues. The MPP guide provides best practices leveraging the C/C++ language to generate a guide of genuine value to engineers who are approaching multicore programming. This working group was chaired by Rob Oshana of NXP Semiconductors and David Stewart of CriticalBlue.

in 2015, the Software/Hardware Interface for Multicore/Manycore (SHIM) working group delivered a specification to define an architecture description standard useful for software design. Some architectural features that SHIM describes are the hardware topology including processor cores, accelerators, caches, and inter-core communication channels, with selected details of each element, and instruction, memory, and communication performance information. This working group was chaired by Masaki Gondo of eSOL .

== Active Working Groups ==
- The Multicore Communications API (MCAPI) working group is currently adding more features and functions to expand the usefulness of MCAPI for Version 2.x. The working group is working on interoperability and 'zero copy' functionality, including bidirectional interaction between 'application and application' using shared memory and bidirectional interaction between 'application and driver', which is being led by Sven Brehmer of PolyCore Software.
- The Virtualization working group will focus on defining and optimizing a set of paravirtualization information and functions to communicate with a Hypervisor. The working group will also focus on a system to categorize the various virtualization features and functionality including within multicore processors. This working group is chaired by Rajan Goyal of Cavium Networks and Surender Kumar of Nokia Networks.
- The Open Asymmetric Multi Processing (OpenAMP) working group will focus on standardizing the APIs, providing detailed documentation for the specification, and expanding the functionality of OpenAMP. This working group is chaired by Tomas Evensen of Xilinx.

== OpenAMP ==
The OpenAMP Multicore Framework is an open source framework for developing asymmetric multi-processing (AMP) systems application software, similar to OpenMP for symmetric multi-processing systems.

There are several implementations of OpenAMP Multicore Framework, each one intended to interoperate with all the other implementations over the OpenAMP API. One implementation of the Multicore Framework, originally developed for the Xilinx Zynq, has been open sourced under the OpenAMP open source project. Mentor Embedded Multicore Framework (MEMF) is a proprietary implementation of the OpenAMP standard.

The OpenAMP API standard is managed under the umbrella of Multicore Association.
