= Sunway BlueLight =

Chinese supercomputer

- Location: Jǐnán National Supercomputing Center, Jinan, Shandong, China
- Architecture: Sunway
- Speed: 795.9 TFLOPS (sustained), 1.07016 PFLOPS (peak)

The Sunway BlueLight (神威蓝光) is a Chinese massively parallel supercomputer. It is the first publicly announced PFLOPS supercomputer using Sunway processors solely developed by the People's Republic of China.

It ranked #2 in the 2011 China HPC Top100, #14 on the November 2011 TOP500 list, and #39 on the November 2011 Green500 List. The machine was installed at National Supercomputing Jǐnán Center (国家超算济南中心) in September 2011 and was developed by National Parallel Computer Engineering Technology Research Center (国家并行计算机工程技术研究中心) and supported by Technology Department (科技部) 863 project. The water-cooled 9-rack system has 8704 ShenWei SW1600 processors (For the Top100 run 8575 CPUs were used, at 975 MHz each) organized as 34 super nodes (each consisting of 256 compute nodes), 150 TB main memory, 2 PB external storage, peak performance of 1.07016 PFLOPS, sustained performance of 795.9 TFLOPS, LINPACK efficiency 74.37%, and total power consumption 1074 kW.

The Sunway BlueLight is ranked 103rd as of the November 2015 TOP500 list (ranked highest at 14th when it appeared on the list in November 2011; then 65th in the November 2014).

== See also ==
- Sunway TaihuLight
- TOP500
