= Sunway SW26010 =

The SW26010 is a 260-core manycore processor designed by the Shanghai Integrated Circuit Technology and Industry Promotion Center (ICC for short)(Chinese: 上海集成电路技术与产业促进中心 (简称ICC)). It implements the Sunway architecture, a 64-bit reduced instruction set computing (RISC) architecture designed in China. The SW26010 has four clusters of 64 Compute-Processing Elements (CPEs) which are arranged in an eight-by-eight array. The CPEs support SIMD instructions and are capable of performing eight double-precision floating-point operations per cycle. Each cluster is accompanied by a more conventional general-purpose core called the Management Processing Element (MPE) that provides supervisory functions. Each cluster has its own dedicated DDR3 SDRAM controller and a memory bank with its own address space. The processor runs at a clock speed of 1.45 GHz.

The CPE cores feature 64 KB of scratchpad memory for data and 16 KB for instructions, and communicate via a network on a chip, instead of having a traditional cache hierarchy. The MPEs have a more traditional setup, with 32 KB L1 instruction and data caches and a 256 KB L2 cache. Finally, the on-chip network connects to a single system interconnection interface that connects the chip to the outside world.

The SW26010 is used in the Sunway TaihuLight supercomputer, which between March and June 2018, was the world's fastest supercomputer as ranked by the TOP500 project. The system uses 40,960 SW26010s to obtain 93.01 PFLOPS on the LINPACK benchmark.

== Successor: SW26010P ==
SW26010P includes 6 core groups (CGs), each of which includes one management processing element (MPE), and one 8×8 computing processing element (CPE) cluster. Each CG has its memory controller (MC), connecting to 16 GB of DDR4 memory with a bandwidth of 51.2 GB/s. The data exchange between every two CPEs in the same CPE cluster is achieved through the Remote Memory Access (RMA) interface (a replacement of the register communication feature in the previous generation). Each CPE has a fast local data memory (LDM) of 256 KB. Each SW26010P processor consists of 390 processing elements.

== See also ==
- Massively parallel processor array
- Loongson
- Adapteva
- Cell (microprocessor)
