= ClearSpeed =

UK semiconductor company

ClearSpeed Technology
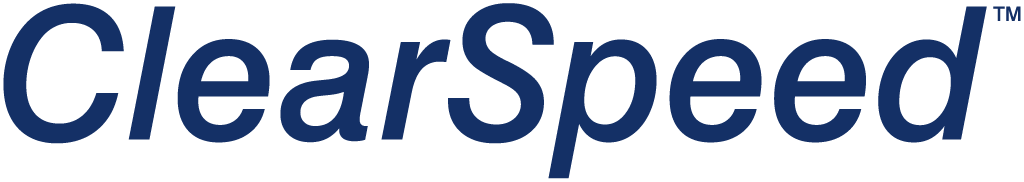
- Type: Private
- Industry: Semiconductor industry
- Founded: Bristol, UK (2002)
- Headquarters: Bristol, UK
- Products: Coprocessors
- Number of employees: Less than 10 (2009)
- Website: ClearSpeed.com

ClearSpeed Technology Ltd was a semiconductor company, formed in 2002 to develop enhanced SIMD processors for use in high-performance computing and embedded systems. Based in Bristol, UK, the company has been selling its processors since 2005. Its current 192-core CSX700 processor was released in 2008, but a lack of sales has forced the company to downsize and it has since delisted from the London stock exchange.

== Products ==
The CSX700 processor consists of two processing arrays, each with 96 processing elements. The processing elements each contain a 32/64-bit floating point multiplier, a 32/64-bit floating point adder, 6 KB of SRAM, an integer arithmetic logic unit, and a 16-bit integer multiply–accumulate unit. It currently sells its CSX700 processor on a PCI Express expansion card with 2 GB of memory, called the Advance e710. The card is supplied with the ClearSpeed Software Development Kit and application libraries.

Related multi-core architectures include Ambric, PicoChip, Cell BE, Texas Memory Systems, and GPGPU stream processors such as AMD FireStream and Nvidia Tesla. ClearSpeed competes with AMD and Nvidia in the hardware acceleration market, where computationally intensive applications offload tasks to the accelerator. As of 2009, only the ClearSpeed e710 performs 64-bit arithmetic at its peak computational rate.

== History ==
- In November 2003 ClearSpeed demonstrated the CS301, with 64 processing elements running at 200 MHz, and peak 25.6 FP32 GFLOPS.
- In June 2005 ClearSpeed demonstrated the CSX600, with 96 processing elements running at 210 MHz, capable of 40 GFLOPS.
- In September 2005 John Gustafson joined ClearSpeed as CTO of high performance computing.
- In November 2005 ClearSpeed made its first significant sale of CSX600 processors to the Tokyo Institute of Technology using X620 Advance cards.
- In November 2006 ClearSpeed X620 Advance cards helped place the Tsubame cluster 7th in the TOP500 list of supercomputers. The cards continue to be used in 2009.
- In September 2007 ClearSpeed licensed its next generation processor to BAE Systems for inclusion in satellite systems.
- In February 2007 ClearSpeed raised £20 million in share placing on the AIM market.
- In June 2008 ClearSpeed released the CSX700, combining two CSX600 devices with a PCI Express x16 interface and ECC on all memories, using a lower power 90 nm process. The device delivers 96 GFLOPS for 9 watts with 192 processing elements running at 250 MHz. The device was also released on the Advance e710 card at the same time.
- In February 2009 ClearSpeed announced a cost-cutting programme following poor financial results for 2008.
- In July 2009 ClearSpeed delisted from the London Stock Exchange and returned £6.9 million to its shareholders.
- In August 2009 ClearSpeed made its most significant sale through high performance and heterogeneous compute specialists PetaPath.
