= CPU shielding =

CPU shielding is a practice where on a multiprocessor system or on a CPU with multiple cores, real-time tasks can run on one CPU or core while non-real-time tasks run on another.

The operating system must be able to set a CPU affinity for both processes and interrupts.

== Kernel space ==
In Linux in order to shield CPUs from individual interrupts being serviced on them you have to make sure that the following kernel configuration parameter is set:

- CONFIG_IRQBALANCE

== See also ==
- Multi-core
- Multiprocessing
- Processor affinity
- Real-time computing
