= StarWind Software =

American computer storage company

StarWind Software Inc.
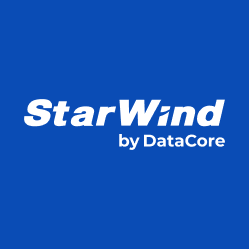
- Type: Commercial
- Industry: Computer software, Storage virtualization, Software-defined storage
- Founded: 2008
- Headquarters: Beverly, Massachusetts, U.S.
- Key people: Anton Kolomyeytsev (Organizational founder), Dave Zabrowski (CEO)
- Website: www.starwindsoftware.com

StarWind Software, Inc. is a software and hardware appliance company based in Beverly, Massachusetts specializing in storage virtualization and software-defined storage. Originally held privately, it was acquired by DataCore Software in May 2025.

== History ==
StarWind Software began in 2008 as a spin-off from Rocket Division Software, Ltd. (founded in 2003), with a round A of investment from venture capital firm ABRT. It started providing early adopters with initially free software defined storage offerings in 2009, including its V2V (virtual-to-virtual) image converter and iSCSI SAN software.

In 2013, hard drive manufacturer Western Digital began integrating StarWind's iSCSI engine with some of the company's Network Attached Storage (NAS) appliances.

In February 2020, StarWind's Hyperconverged Infrastructure (HCI) software StarWind VSAN set performance benchmarks for off the shelf commodity hardware. In December, StarWind was named to Gartner's Magic Quadrant for HCI software.

In March 2022, the Wall Street Journal reported how the 2022 Russian invasion of Ukraine was affecting technology firms with a significant presence in Ukraine, including StarWind. Once the invasion was imminent, the company helped its employees move out of the country, including relocating 60 of the 180 workers from its Kyiv, Ukraine office to Wroclaw, Poland. The company also reportedly doubled the salaries of employees who enlisted in the Ukrainian army.

In May 2025, StarWind was acquired by DataCore Software.

== Products ==
StarWind develops "standards-based storage virtualization and management software that will run on any x86 platform". Its software-defined storage software supports building iSCSI, iSER, NVM Express over Fabrics (NVMe-oF), and NFSv3/v4 and SMB3 NAS using commodity hardware.
