= Conexant =

American company

Conexant Systems, Inc.
- Type: Subsidiary
- Traded as: Nasdaq: CNXT
- Industry: Semiconductor industry and software industry
- Founded: January 4, 1999; 27 years ago
- Defunct: 2017
- Headquarters: Irvine, California, U.S.
- Key people: Rick Bergman (CEO)
- Products: Semiconductors for voice and audio processing (AudioSmart) and imaging (ImagingSmart)
- Revenue: $112 million (FY14)
- Number of employees: 312 (2014)
- Parent: Synaptics
- Website: conexant.com at the Wayback Machine (archived 2009-02-28)

Conexant Systems, Inc. was an American-based software developer and fabless semiconductor company that developed technology for voice and audio processing, imaging and modems. The company began as a division of Rockwell International, before being spun off as a public company. Conexant itself then spun off several business units, creating independent public companies which included Skyworks Solutions and Mindspeed Technologies.

The company was acquired by computing interface technology company Synaptics, Inc. in July 2017.

== History ==
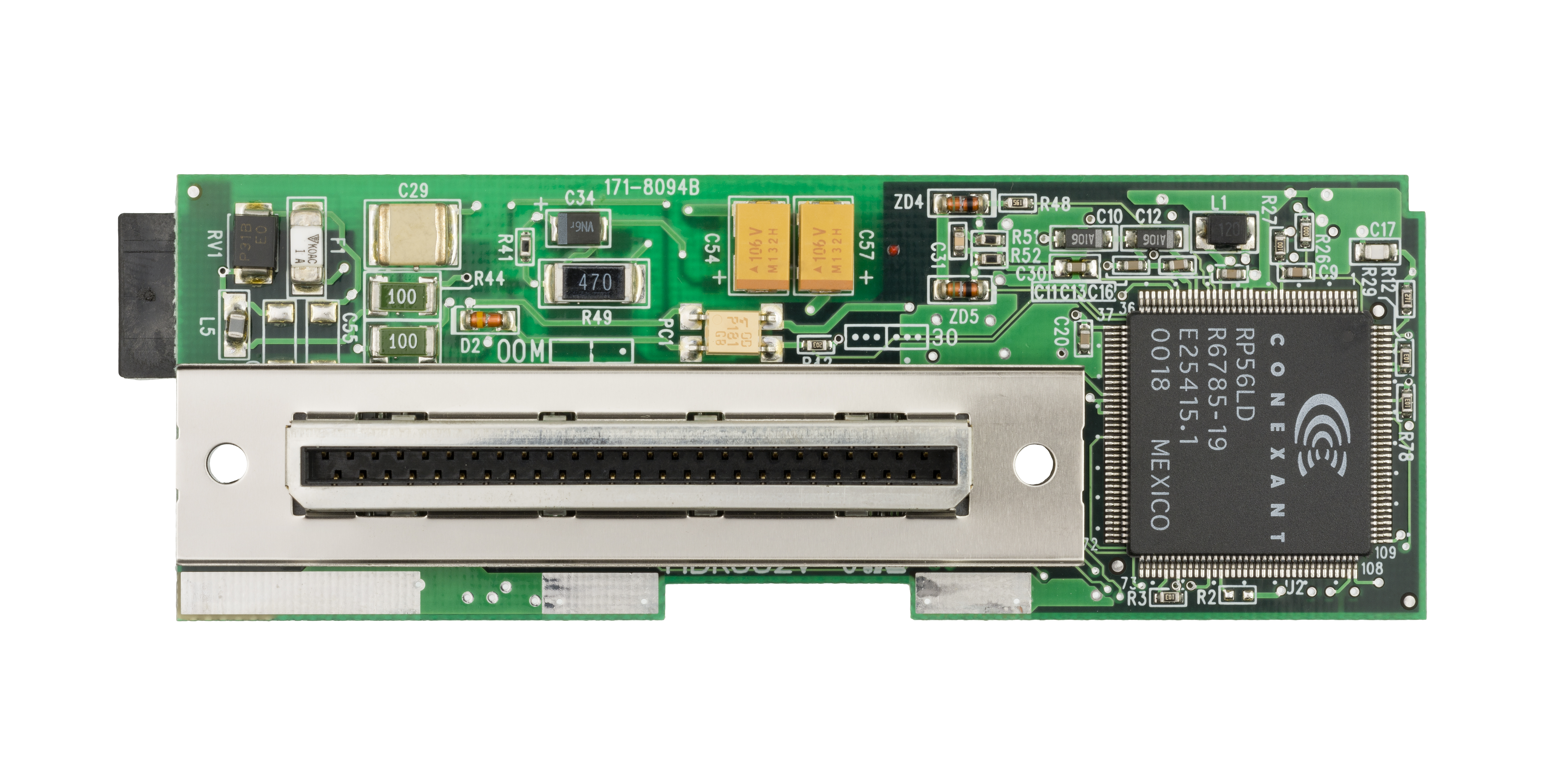
The motherboard for a dial-up modem for the Sega Dreamcast video game console, showing a Conexant chip

In 1996, Rockwell International Corporation incorporated its semiconductor division as Rockwell Semiconductor Systems, Inc. On January 4, 1999, Rockwell spun off Conexant Systems, Inc. as a public company. It was listed on the NASDAQ under symbol CNXT on January 4, 1999. At that time, Conexant became the world's largest, standalone communications-IC company. Dwight W. Decker was its first chief executive officer and chairman of its board of directors. The company was based in Newport Beach, California.

In the early 2000s, Conexant spun off several standalone technology businesses to create public companies. In March 2002, Conexant entered into a joint venture agreement with The Carlyle Group to share ownership of its wafer fabrication plant, called Jazz Semiconductor.

In June 2002, Conexant spun off its wireless communications division, which merged immediately following the spinoff with Massachusetts-based chip manufacturer Alpha Industries Inc. to form publicly held Skyworks Solutions Inc. In June 2003, Conexant spun off its Internet infrastructure business to create the publicly held company Mindspeed Technologies Inc. Mindspeed would eventually be acquired by M/A-COM Technology Solutions, based in Lowell, Massachusetts.

In 2004, Conexant merged with Red Bank, New Jersey, semiconductor company GlobespanVirata, Inc., with Conexant as the surviving corporation. Subsequently, GlobespanVirata’s name was changed to Conexant, Inc.

In April 2008, Conexant announced the sale of its broadband media processing business, which provided products for satellite, cable and IPTV applications, to Dutch semiconductor manufacturer NXP Semiconductors NV.

In September 2008, Jazz was sold to Israel-based Tower Semiconductor Ltd and became known as TowerJazz.

In August 2009, Conexant sold its broadband access product line to Fremont, California, semiconductor company Ikanos Communications.

In February 2011, an agreement was announced for San Francisco investment firm Golden Gate Capital to acquire all of the outstanding shares of Conexant at a price of $2.40 per share, and take the company private.

In February 2013, citing the burden of servicing debt related to multiple corporate acquisitions in the late 1990s, as well as the loss of revenue from the bankruptcy of key customer Eastman Kodak, Conexant filed for Chapter 11 protection in the U.S. Bankruptcy Court for the District of Delaware. As part of the bankruptcy agreement, the company agreed on a restructuring plan with owners and its sole secured lender, QP SFM Capital Holdings Ltd. The reorganized company emerged from bankruptcy in July 2013. As part of the operational restructuring, the company moved its headquarters from Newport Beach to nearby Irvine, and focused on a narrower product portfolio, consisting of far-field voice input processing-based devices, video surveillance and printer systems on a chip (SoCs).

Since 2013, Conexant's silicon and software solutions for voice processing have been instrumental in the CE industry's proliferation of voice-enabled devices. The company's AudioSmart brand of voice input processors and embedded far-field processing software has become adopted by CE device manufacturers in numerous products ranging from Artificially Intelligent digital assistant devices and smart speakers to voice-enabled televisions and personal robots. In February 2016, it was announced that Korean electronics company LG Electronics was going to integrate Conexant's CX2092x far-field voice input processor system-on-chip (SoC) into two of its smart home products: a set-top box and an IoT hub for controlling home electronic devices.

In March 2016, Conexant announced that its AudioSmart software was being integrated into Qualcomm's Hexagon digital signal processor family, a major component of Qualcomm's Snapdragon processor reportedly contained in over 1 billion smart devices.

In December 2016, Conexant and Amazon co-announced the AudioSmart 2-Mic Development Kit for Amazon AVS, a commercial-grade reference solution that streamlines the design and implementation of audio front end systems. Based on the Conexant AudioSmart™ CX20921 Voice Input Processor, the dual microphone board was designed to reduce time-to-market for new third-party voice-enabled Alexa devices.

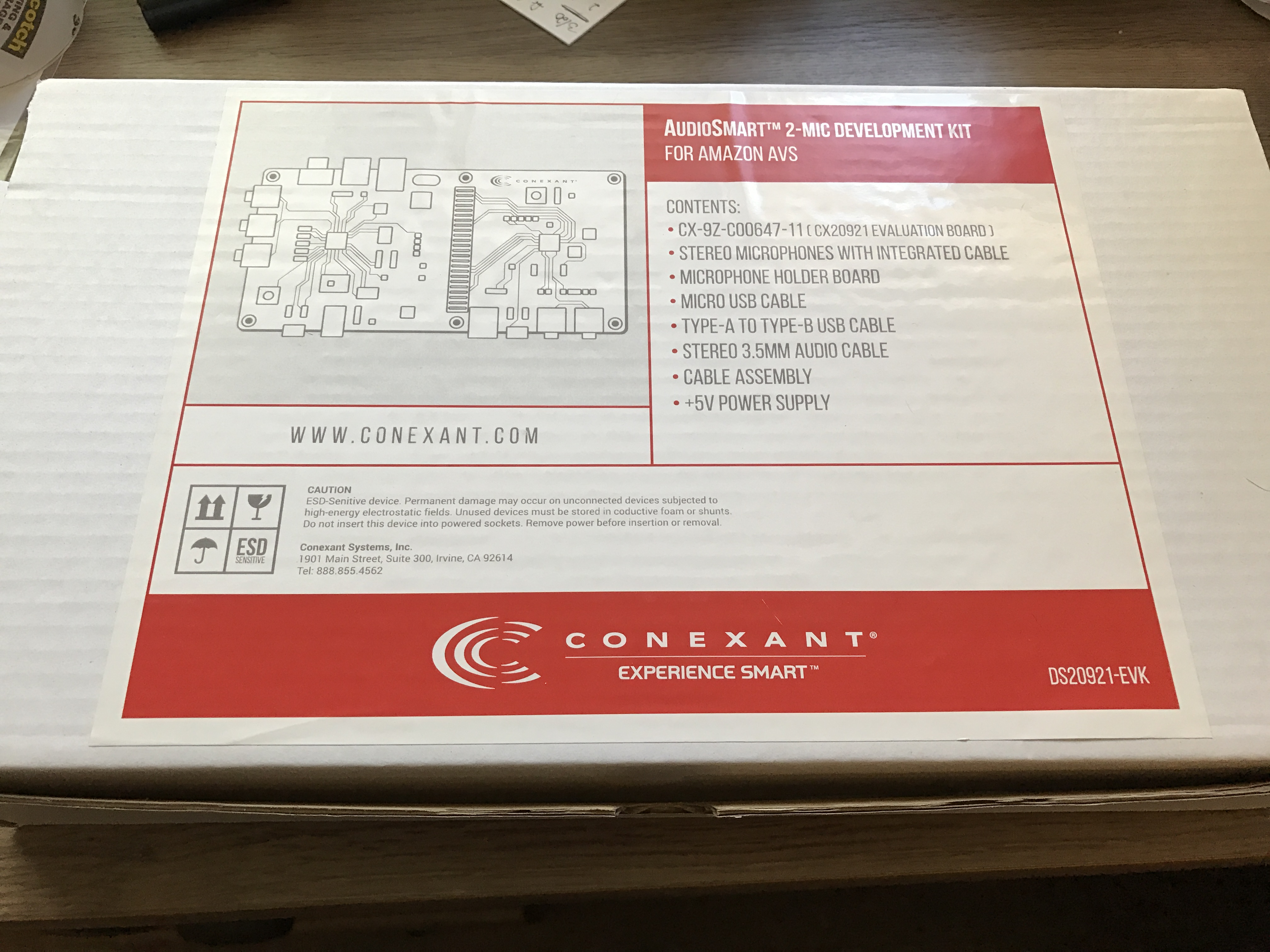
Conexant 2-Mic Dev Kit for AVS Devices

On May 11, 2017, news appeared that security researchers discovered that Conexant's audio drivers were installing keylogger software, including many laptops sold by HP. The keylogger writes every single keystroke typed by a user (including passwords) and stores them in an unencrypted file on the user's computer.

On July 26, 2017, Synaptics completed its acquisition of Conexant Systems, LLC.

By November 2017, Conexant.com was no longer available.

== Product line ==
Conexant had two main product families: the AudioSmart brand of audio processors and the ImagingSmart brand of image processors and modems.

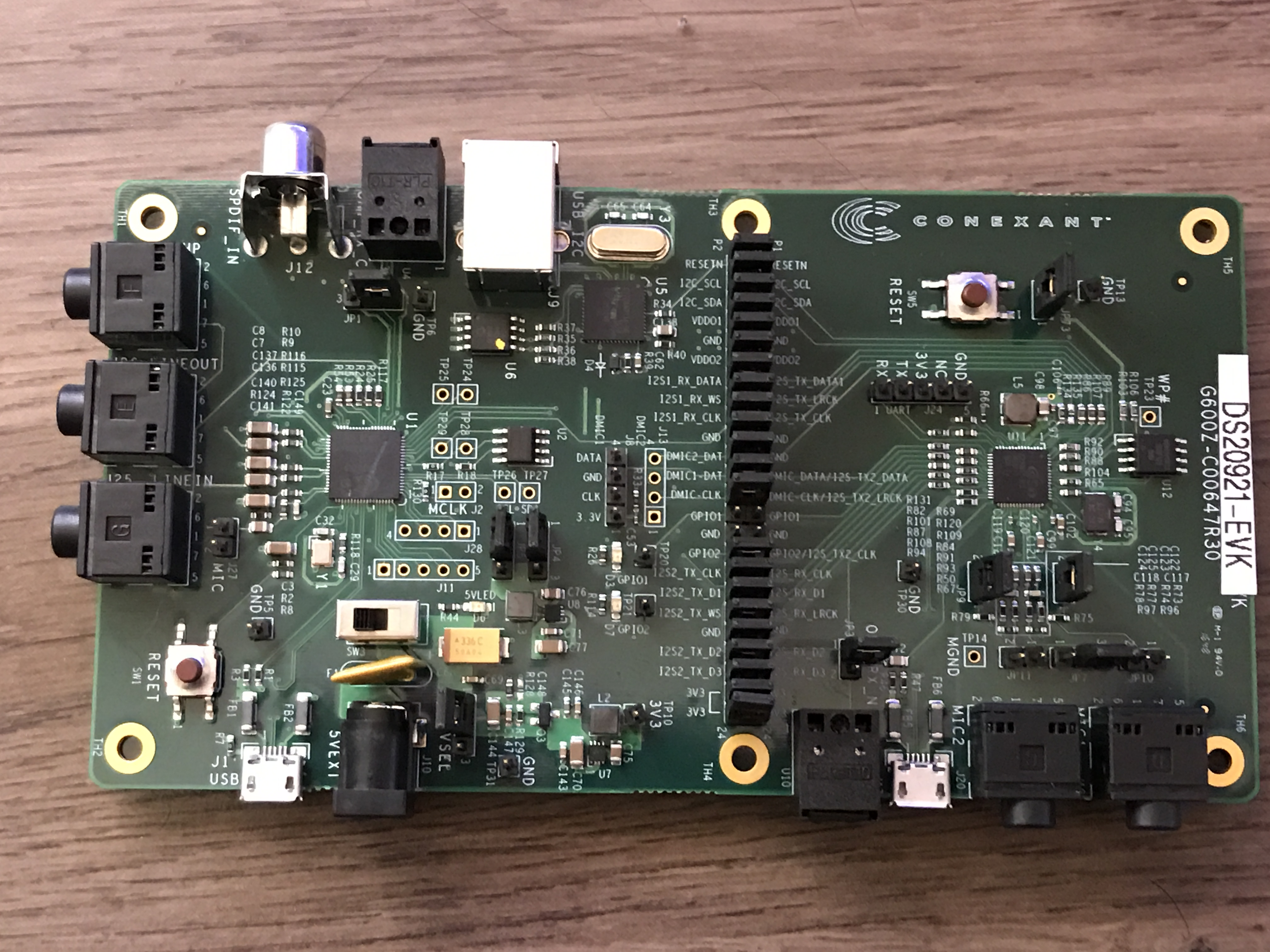
Conexant CX20921 2-Mic Development Kit for Amazon AVS

=== AudioSmart ===
AudioSmart was a line of analog-to-digital converters (AD Converter), codecs, USB digital signal processor (DSP) codecs, voice/speech processors, and software that improved how audio signals are processed for electronic audio equipment.

- AD Converters – Conexant's analog to digital converters were used for far-field voice/speech capture applications. They converted analog signals to digital in order to enhance the signal before transmitting it to third party speech recognition products. The technology is used in voice-enabled consumer products. A low power version with a standby mode and a fast wake up mode is used for battery powered devices.
- Codecs – Conexant's codecs encoded and decoded digital signals, to allow transmission, storage, encryption, and playback or editing. The codecs were used to improve audio signals in tablets and PCs, and for consumer audio applications such as conferencing, streaming media and editing.
- USB & I^{2}S DSP codecs – Conexant's DSP codecs had USB and integrated interchip sound (I^{2}S) interfaces to connect to electronic devices such as headsets and docking stations.
- VoiceSpeech processors – Conexant's VoiceSpeech line of system-on-chip (SoC) speech processors added voice command capabilities to smart TVs. Far-field voice pre-processing algorithms and 24-bit analog-to-digital conversion prevent a noisy television itself from interfering with a user's commands. The company's Smart Source Pickup technology maintained speech recognition in the presence of external noise. At CES 2016, Conexant introduced a new four-microphone voice input processor for smart voice applications, which included the company's Smart Source Locator (SSL) software, which gave the chip 360-degree voice location and speech recognition within 15 meters (49 ft).
- AudioSmart software – Conexant developed AudioSmart software, audio and voice processing technologies for far-field voice communication and far-field speech control. Applications included speech recognition for smart home, smart phone, IoT, robotic and wearable devices, voice calls using social media apps, or Skype calling. Conexant's AudioSmart software was available on Windows, Android and Linux operating systems.

=== ImagingSmart ===
ImagingSmart was a line of silicon and software to improve performance of image dependent electronic equipment, such as document and photo imaging controllers, digital video, and devices with integrated fax or data modems, such as printers or point-of-sale terminals.

- Document and photo imaging controllers – Conexant offered products for single-function and multi-function printers, photo printers, and other advanced printers. The chips integrate input/output features, including USB and serial, and embedded firmware allows printing to shared printers using tablets or smartphones. The technology was compatible using Wi-Fi with several cloud computing printing services.
- Digital video – Conexant's digital video and image encoders and HD processors were designed to improve video communications. The company also offered analog video decoders which capture and convert analog, terrestrial, and digital broadcast video.
- Fax modem chips and data modem chips – Conexant's fax modem chips with VoIP support added fax modem functionality to multi-function printers. The low-power chips supported V.34 packet connectivity over enterprise networks, per the ITU-T G.1050 Network model for evaluating multimedia transmission performance over Internet Protocol. Data modem chips are deployed in point-of-sale terminals.

== Operations ==
Conexant's headquarters was in Irvine, California.

== See also ==
- Brooktree, a semiconductor company purchased by Rockwell Semiconductor in 1996 whose assets Conexant owned
