= Jiangnan Computing Lab =

Chinese research institution

The Jiangnan Computing Lab, formally known as the Jiangnan Computing Technology Research Institute (江南计算技术研究所 in Chinese), also known as the 56th Research Institute of the Cyberspace Force of the Chinese People's Liberation Army, is a major Chinese research institution specializing in high-performance computing, processors, and related technologies. Established in 1951, it is one of China's earliest large-scale comprehensive research institutes combining computer science and engineering. It is located in Wuxi (无锡), Jiangsu Province, near the scenic Taihu Lake in the southern suburbs (often described as being at the foot of Xuelang Mountain).

They develop the Sunway TaihuLight supercomputer.
