= Cloud Cruiser =

US cloud-based financial management company

- Type: Subsidiary
- Industry: service management, cost management software, cloud financial management
- Founded: January 2010
- Founders: David Zabrowski, Gregory Howard
- Headquarters: Roseville, California; San Jose, California, United States
- Area served: Americas, Europe, the Middle East and Africa
- Products: Cloud Cruiser Enterprise 4, Cloud Cruiser Express
- Parent: Hewlett Packard Enterprise
- Website: www.hpe.com/us/en/services/cloud-cost-management.html

Cloud Cruiser is a cloud-based financial management company based in Silicon Valley. Founded in January 2010 by David Zabrowski and Gregory Howard, Cloud Cruiser has offices in Roseville and San Jose, California, and the Netherlands.

== History ==
Cloud Cruiser was founded in January 2010 by David Zabrowski and Gregory Howard.

Cloud Cruiser partnered companies such as Hewlett-Packard, Microsoft, VMware, Amazon Marketplace and Cisco. In July 2010, Wavepoint Ventures led Cloud Cruiser's first round of funding. It included investments from Roger Akers of Akers Capital and other San Francisco Bay Area angel investors. In March 2011, Cloud Cruiser came out of stealth mode and released its eponymous software later that year.

In June 2012, the company raised an additional $6 million in series B funding, led by ONSET Ventures. In 2013, Cloud Cruiser became available for Windows Server 2012 R2 through Microsoft Azure.

In February 2014, the company's software was made available to OpenStack users through Rackspace. Cloud Cruiser started offering OpenStack integration in 2011. In October 2014, Cloud Cruiser 4 was released.

In 2017, Hewlett Packard Enterprise acquired the company.

== See also ==
- Cloud computing
- Financial management
