= Kalray =

French semiconductor company

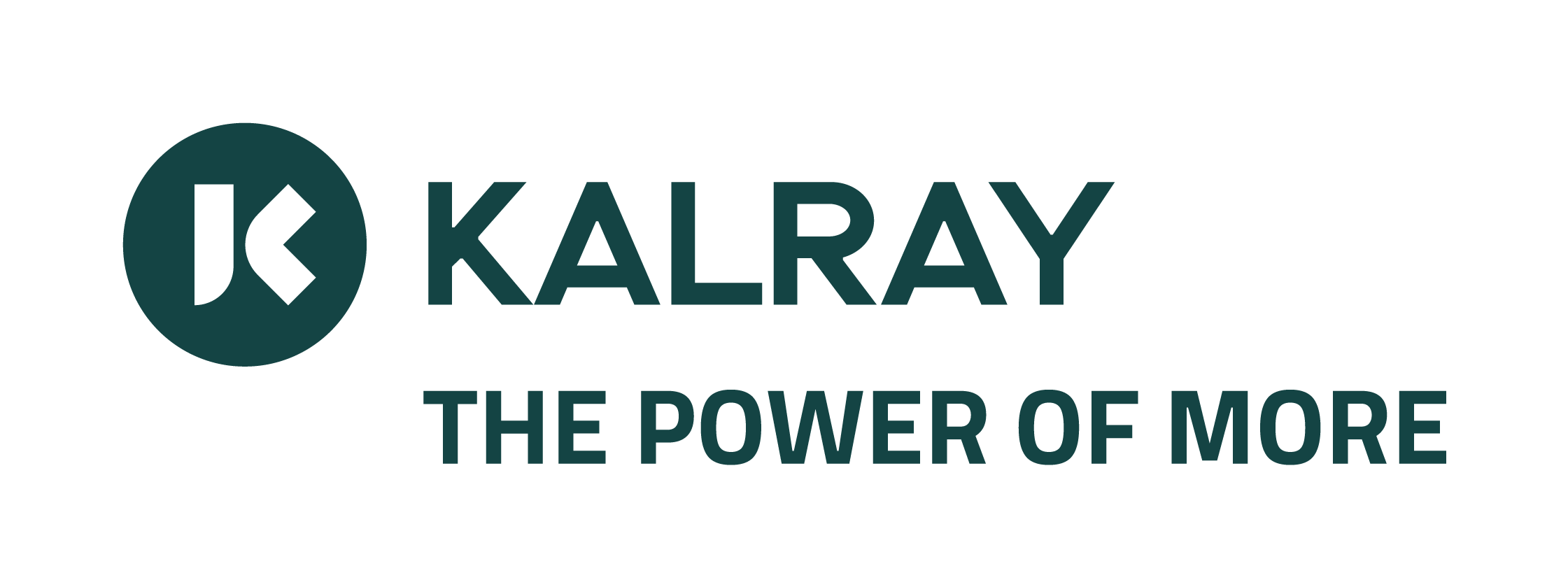
- Type: Société Anonyme
- Traded as: Euronext Growth
- Industry: Semiconductors
- Founded: 27 August 2008; 18 years ago
- Headquarters: Montbonnot, Rhône-Alpes, France
- Key people: Eric Baissus (CEO)
- Products: Many-core processor
- Revenue: 25,829,000 ±1000 (2023)
- Net income: −11,694,000 ±1000 (2023)
- Number of employees: 92 (2025)
- Website: www.kalrayinc.com

Kalray is a French fabless semiconductor company headquartered in Montbonnot, France.

== Corporate history ==
Kalray was founded in 2008 as a spin-off of CEA French lab, with investors such as Renault–Nissan–Mitsubishi Alliance, Safran, NXP Semiconductors, CEA and Bpifrance.

In April 2020, Kalray announced an $8 million investment from NXP which allows them to be able to develop various solutions for autonomous driving together.

In January 2022, Kalray negotiated with arcapix Holdings Ltd. for their acquisition. Arcapix is the parent company of pixitmedia and arcastream. At the Flash Memory Summit Awards (FMS) in August 2022, Kalray was awarded the Most Innovative Technology award for their Flashbox. In May 2023, the IP-CUBE project that is led by Kalray won the "Technological Maturation and Demonstration of Embedded Artificial Intelligence Solutions" label under the "France Relance 2030 – Future Investments" plan.

In February 2024, Kalray announced a collaboration with Arm.

In 2025, Kalray sold its software activities to DataCore Software.

== Product history ==
The first Kalray patent was filed in 2010. Today the company holds more than 30 patent families, including 2 families with an exclusive CEA license.

On 22 June 2015, Kalray began the distribution of data center acceleration board families: TurboCard and KONIC, for networking and storage applications, both of which can be programmed with either standard C or C++. TurboCard and KONIC both utilize the MPPA2-256 Bostan second generation processor.

In January 2019, Kalray and NXP began a partnership for new platforms for automated driving. The Massively Parallel Processor Array (MPPA) chips from Kalray together with the two NXP chips will be used in the new BlueBox 2.0. Together with Wistron, Kalray launched the FURIO1200 storage system in January 2021. The K200-LP accelerator card was launched in June 2021.

Kalray was granted a fund from the French government in May 2023 to develop the Dolomites manycore processor.

== Kalray chips ==
Kalray chips are code-named after Mountains. However each chip is called a "MPPA" for "massively parallel processor array":

=== MPPA-256 Andey ===
Produced in 2013 in CMOS 28HP technology from TSMC, this SoC (or System-on-Chip) runs at 400 MHz and contains 256 VLIW processing cores.

=== MPPA2-256 Bostan ===
Produced in 2015 with the same CMOS 28HP technology from TSMC, this SoC running at 550 MHz was enhanced to increase the floating-point performance of the VLIW cores, to natively support the Linux operating system, and to process high-speed Ethernet (up to 80 Gbit/s). Each VLIW core was extended with a tightly coupled cryptographic coprocessor for security protocol acceleration.

=== MPPA2.2-256 Bostan2 ===
Produced in 2017, this processor is based on the previous generation, Bostan, with an improved DDR controller, Ethernet controller and PCIe controller. As a result, this processor fully supports the NVM Express (NVMe) standard interface (for connecting hosts to PCIe bus-attached SSDs), and also the NVMe over Fabrics standard using RDMA (for connections between servers, storage controllers, and NVMe enclosures).

=== MPPA3-80 Coolidge ===
The third-generation MPPA processor Coolidge has been released. Based on TSMC 16 nm FinFET process technology, this processor includes 80 64-bit VLIW processing cores distributed among 5 clusters, 8x 25 Gbit/s Ethernet and 16x PCIe Gen4 interfaces. Each VLIW core is extended with a tightly coupled tensor co-processor for deep learning application acceleration.

=== MPPA3-80 Coolidge2 ===
The Coolidge2 DPU Processor was released in 2023 and is aimed at LLMs, with an additional focus on efficient usage of NVME storage.

== Listing on Euronext ==
In 2017, ahead of the launch of Kalray's third-generation microprocessor, Safran and Pengpai joined the company's historical investors (mainly CEA Investissement, ACE, INOCAP). In 2018, Alliance Ventures (strategic venture capital fund operated by Renault-Nissan-Mitsubishi) and Definvest (an investment fund managed by Bpifrance on behalf of the French Ministry of Armed Forces) also acquired stakes in Kalray.

On June 12, 2018, Kalray launched its IPO on the Euronext Paris Stock Market and raised €47.7M (after exercise of the over-allocation option), "the most significant IPO since Euronext Growth was created in Paris."
