= Reconfigurability =

- Field: Computer Engineering, Wireless Communication, Control Engineering

Reconfigurability denotes the Reconfigurable Computing capability of a system, so that its behavior can be changed by reconfiguration, i. e. by loading different configware code. This static reconfigurability distinguishes between reconfiguration time and run time. Dynamic reconfigurability denotes the capability of a dynamically reconfigurable system that can dynamically change its behavior during run time, usually in response to dynamic changes in its environment.

In the context of Wireless communication dynamic reconfigurability tackles the changeable behavior of wireless networks and associated equipment, specifically in the fields of radio spectrum, radio access technologies, protocol stacks, and application services.

Research regarding the (dynamic) reconfigurability of Wireless communication systems is ongoing for example in working group 6 of the Wireless World Research Forum (WWRF), in the Wireless Innovation Forum (WINNF) (formerly Software Defined Radio Forum), and in the European FP6 project End-to-End Reconfigurability (E²R). Recently, E²R initiated a related standardization effort on the cohabitation of heterogeneous wireless radio systems in the framework of the IEEE P1900.4 Working Group. See cognitive radio.

In the context of Control reconfiguration, a field of fault-tolerant control within control engineering, reconfigurability is a property of faulty systems meaning that the original control goals specified for the fault-free system can be reached after suitable control reconfiguration.
