= PicoChip =

Picochip was a venture-backed fabless semiconductor company based in Bath, England, founded in 2000. In January 2012 Picochip was acquired by Mindspeed Technologies, Inc and subsequently by Intel.

The company was active in two areas, with two distinct product families.

Picochip was one of the first companies to start developing solutions for small cell basestation (femtocells), for homes and offices. These help combat reception issues such as: dropped calls, poor sound quality, delays, and slow downloads. The idea is to increase the capacity of cellular networks and to address coverage holes.

== Multi-core DSP ==
Picochip developed a multi-core digital signal processor, the picoArray. This integrates 250–300 individual DSP cores onto a single die (depending on the specific product) and as such it can be described as a massively parallel processor array. Each of these cores is a 16-bit processor with Harvard architecture, local memory and 3-way VLIW. Although each device contained 250–300 processors, the architecture allowed devices to be connected to form far larger systems, in some cases with tens of thousands of cores.

The company had three multi-core DSP products (PC202 / 203 / 205) that delivered approximately 40 GMACS and 200 GIPS of performance. The earlier PC102 is obsolete.

The programming model allows each processor to be coded independently (in ANSI C or assembler) and then to communicate over an any:any interconnect mesh. The communication flows are fixed at compile time, not dynamically at run time (analogous to place & route of an FPGA but at higher level of abstraction). This can be described as communicating sequential processes. Each process maps to a processor, which is fully independent from other processors with "encapsulation", with interaction only through defined message passing and data flows through the mesh. This architecture is also related to object-oriented programming concepts. Notably, the development environment is deterministic: simulation of code is cycle-accurate to hardware execution. Advantages claimed include ease of development, improved reliability of code and software-reuse.

Although the picoArray architecture is generic and could in principle be used for any DSP application, the company has stated its strategy is to focus on wireless infrastructure. In particular, the processor is widely used for baseband processing in WiMAX base stations and for femtocells.

Independent benchmarks of representative communications systems by Berkeley Design (BDTI) indicate that the picoArray delivers significantly better performance-per-dollar than traditional single-core DSP devices.

== Femtocells and small cells ==
Picochip was one of the earliest companies to be active in femtocells and small cells, and first demonstrated a prototype at MWC2005. The company since developed a range of system on a chip (SoC) products named "picoXcell". The company supplied SoCs into the small cell market, and claimed to have 70% share of the High Speed Packet Access (HSPA) market according to data from ABI Research.

The company was a founder member of the Femto Forum, which later was renamed to SmallCell Forum, and was on the executive board of that organisation.

== Corporate ==
Investors included Atlas Venture, AT&T, Highland Capital Partners, Intel Capital, Pond Venture Partners, Rothschild, Samsung and Scottish Equity Partners. There were also undisclosed strategic investors.

As of 2012 the company had raised a total of $110M in venture funding.

In January 2012 Picochip was acquired by Californian company Mindspeed Technologies, Inc. for about $52 million.

In December 2013, Intel acquired Mindspeed's small-cell assets including the picoChip technology.
