= ASOCS =

ASOCS Ltd
- Company type: Private
- Industry: cloud management, wireless network, virtual private cloud, virtualization. telecommunication
- Founded: 2003
- Headquarters: Rosh Ha'ayin, Israel
- Products: cloud computing
- Number of employees: 50-100(November 2018)
- Website: asocscloud.com

ASOCS Ltd. is a privately held company, a developer of on-premise cloud solutions for industries such as retail, real estate, hospitality, health, sports and entertainment. ASOCS is also collaborating with mobile network carriers to support the move to 5G, using full network virtualization and open interfaces such as xRAN, TIP and ONAP. ASOCS is headquartered in Rosh Ha'ayin, Israel, and it also has a development center in Ukraine, Bangalore India and offices in Las Vegas.

== History ==
ASOCS was founded in 2003 by CEO Gilad Garon and CTO Doron Solomon, first as a manufacturer of integrated circuits, and since 2013 has been focusing on virtualized communications for wireless networks.

In February 2013, ASOCS have signed a strategic memorandum of understanding with China Mobile for the joint development, commercialization, testing and deployment of large-scale baseband processing units for China Mobile's next generation Cloud-RAN network.

In September 2017, the company launched Cyrus, an on-premise mobile cloud for enterprises.

In February 2018, ASOCS partnered with Cisco's Open vRAN Ecosystem to provide fully virtualized, NFV-compatible virtual base station solutions for in-building wireless and macro-networks.

On 9 January 2020, Sterlite Technologies Limited acquired 12.8% stake in ASOCS Limited. The acquisition of the stake is to strengthen the company's offering in the currently fast-growing virtualized radio access space.
