= Sunway TaihuLight =

Supercomputer in Jiangsu, China

Coordinates: 31°32′55.01″N 120°14′52.94″E

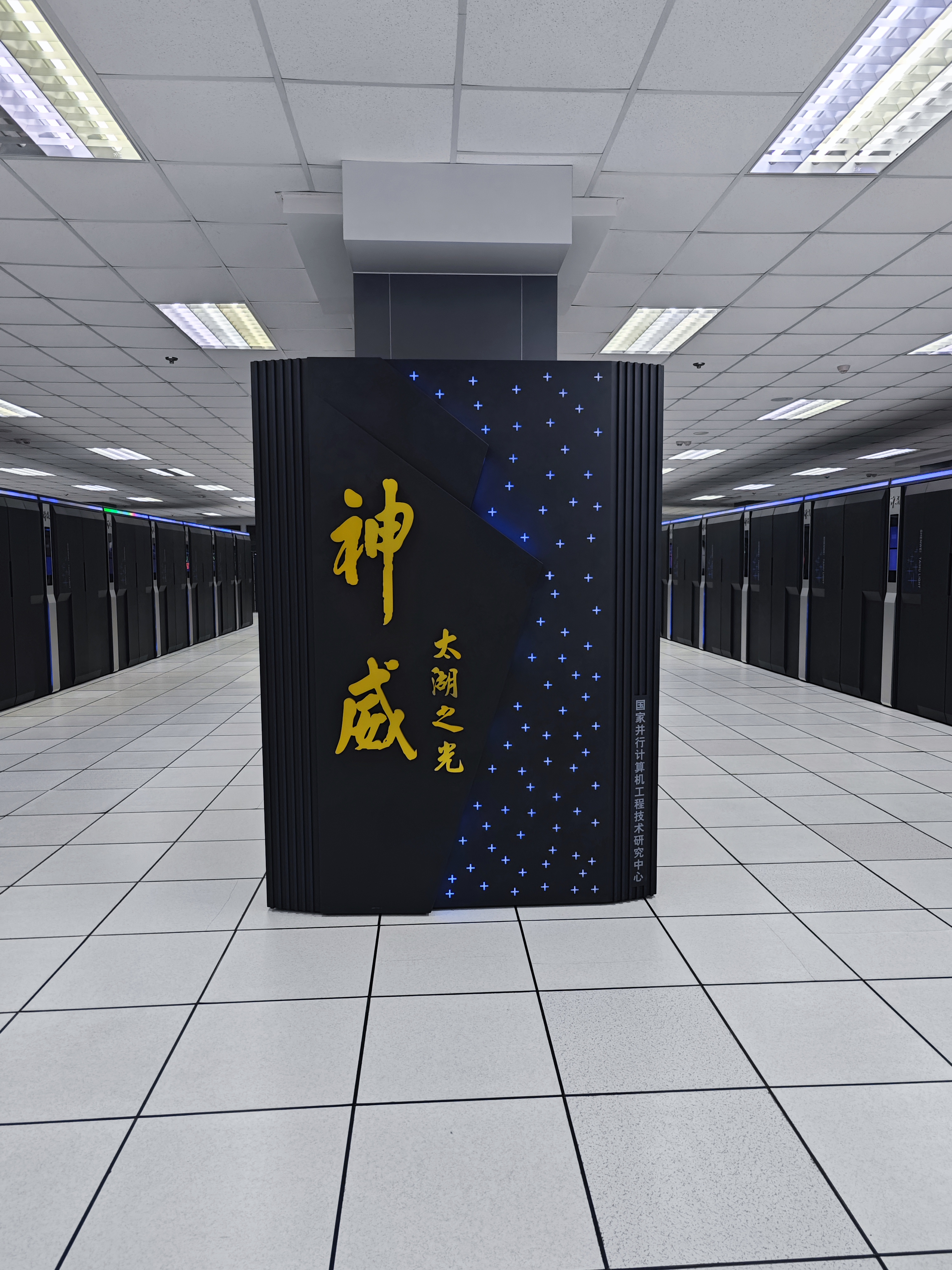
- Active: June 2016
- Operators: National Supercomputing Center in Wuxi
- Location: National Supercomputer Center, Wuxi, Jiangsu, China
- Architecture: Sunway
- Power: 15 MW (LINPACK)
- Operating system: Sunway RaiseOS 2.0.5 (based on Linux)
- Memory: 1.32 PB (5591 TB/s total bandwidth)
- Storage: 20 PB
- Speed: 1.45 GHz (3.06 TFlops single CPU, 105 PFLOPS LINPACK, 125 PFLOPS peak)
- Cost: 1.8 billion Yuan (US$273 million)
- Purpose: Oil prospecting, life sciences, weather forecast, industrial design, pharmaceutical research

The Sunway TaihuLight (Chinese: 神威·太湖之光 Shénwēi·tàihú zhī guāng) is a Chinese supercomputer which, as of November 2025, is ranked 24th in the TOP500 list, with a LINPACK benchmark rating of 93 petaflops. The name is translated as divine power, the light of Taihu Lake. This is nearly three times as fast as the previous Tianhe-2, which ran at 34 petaflops. As of June 2017, it is ranked as the 16th most energy-efficient supercomputer in the Green500, with an efficiency of 6.1 GFlops/watt. It was designed by the National Research Center of Parallel Computer Engineering & Technology (NRCPC) and is located at the National Supercomputing Center in Wuxi in the city of Wuxi, in Jiangsu province, China.

The Sunway TaihuLight was the world's fastest supercomputer for two years, from June 2016 to June 2018, according to the TOP500 lists. The record was surpassed in June 2018 by IBM's Summit.

== Architecture ==
The Sunway TaihuLight utilizes domestically developed semiconductors, including a total of 40,960 Chinese-designed SW26010 manycore 64-bit RISC processors based on the Sunway architecture. Each processor chip contains 256 processing cores, and an additional four auxiliary cores for system management (also RISC cores, just more fully featured) for a total of 10,649,600 CPU cores across the entire system.

The processing cores feature 64 KB of scratchpad memory for data (and 16 KB for instructions) and communicate via a network on a chip, instead of having a traditional cache hierarchy.

== Software ==
The system runs on its own operating system, Sunway RaiseOS 2.0.5, which is based on Linux. The system has its own customized implementation of OpenACC 2.0 to aid the parallelization of code.

== Future development ==
China's first exascale supercomputer was scheduled to enter service by 2020 according to the head of the school of computing at the National University of Defense Technology (NUDT). According to the national plan for the next generation of high performance computers, the country would have develop an exascale computer during the 13th Five-Year-Plan period (2016–2020). The government of Tianjin Binhai New Area, NUDT and the National Supercomputing Center of Tianjin are working on the project. The investment is likely to hit 3 billion yuan ($470.6 million).

== See also ==
- Sunway BlueLight
- Manycore processor
- Massively parallel processor array
- Supercomputing in China
- Summit (supercomputer)

Records
Preceded by Tianhe-2; 33.9 petaflops	World's most powerful supercomputer June 2016 – June 2018	Succeeded by Summit; 200 petaflops
