= Write once =

Write once may refer to:

- Write once, run anywhere, a slogan for the cross-platform benefits of Java
- Write once, compile anywhere, a slogan for the cross-platform benefits of C
- Write-once (cache coherency), a write-invalidate protocol in computer memory design
- Write once read many, computer storage that can be written to once, but read from multiple times
