= James R. Goodman =

American computer scientist

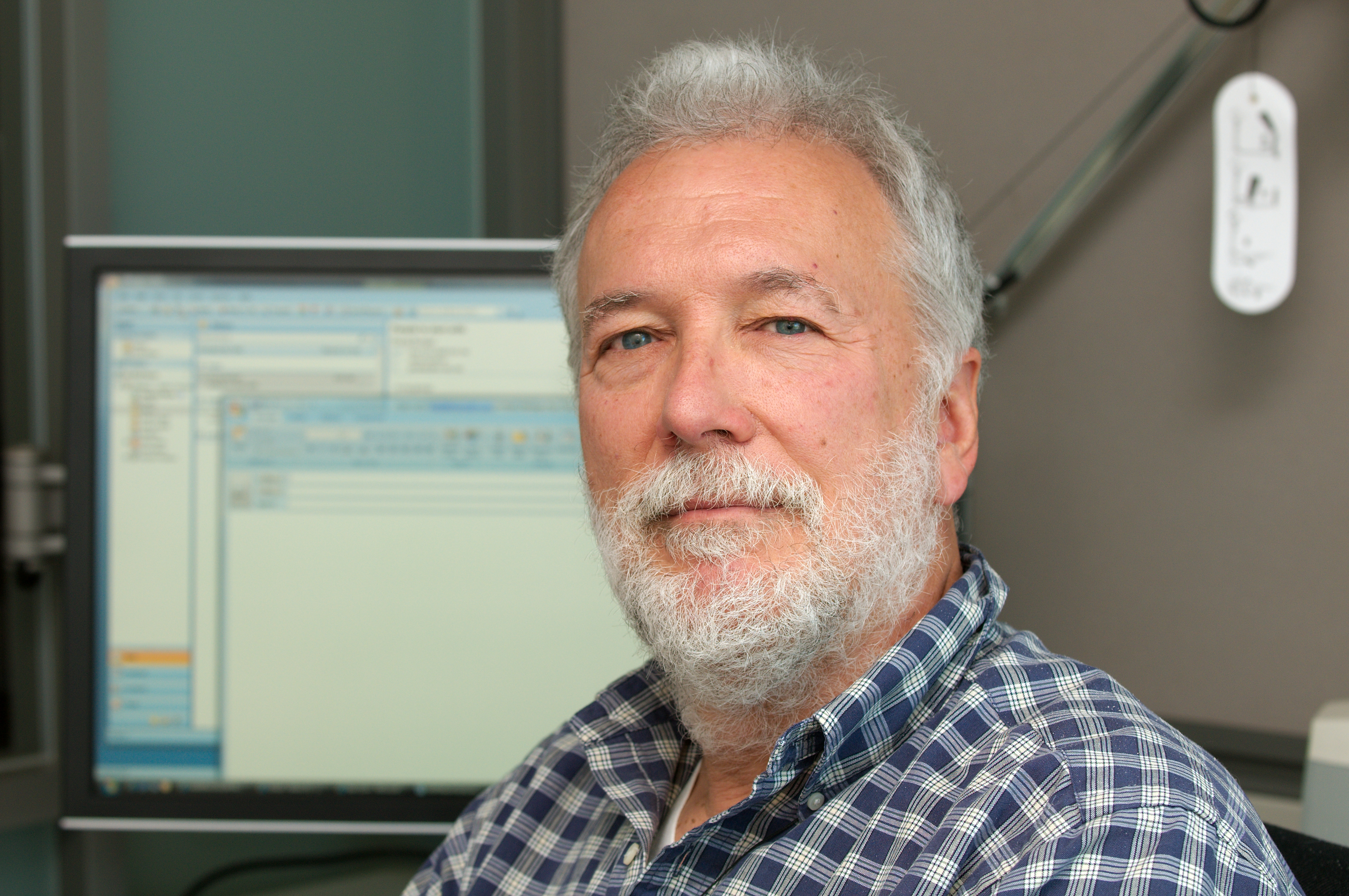
James R. Goodman in 2009.

James Richard "Jim" Goodman (born July 16, 1944) is an emeritus professor of computer science at the University of Wisconsin–Madison and an honorary professor at the University of Auckland in Auckland, New Zealand

== Education and research ==
Goodman received a PhD from the University of California, Berkeley in 1980. He joined the faculty at the University of Wisconsin–Madison the same year as an assistant professor of computer science.

Goodman's research is focused mainly on computer architecture. His current interests are primarily focused on support for Transactional Memory. Goodman's seminal 1983 paper, "Using cache memory to reduce processor-memory traffic", was the first to describe snooping cache coherence protocols and to identify the phenomenon of cache being able to conserve the memory bandwidth.

Goodman is the co-author of A Programmer's View of Computer Architecture ISBN 978-0030972195, a highly acclaimed book on computer architecture, and co-authored with Andrew Tanenbaum Structured Computer Organization ISBN 978-0132916523. In 2007, he was named a Fellow of the IEEE "for contributions to shared-memory multiprocessor system design". In 2010, he was named a Fellow of the Association for Computing Machinery "for contributions to parallel processor and memory system design." In 2013, he received the Eckert–Mauchly Award for "breakthroughs in architecture of shared-memory multiprocessors".

== Personal ==
Goodman was born in 1944 in Topeka, Kansas. Because of his expertise in the field of computer science, he has been interviewed several times as an expert on TV shows such as Campbell Live.
