= Firefly protocol =

Firefly protocol may refer to:

- Firefly (cache coherence protocol), a cache coherence protocol used in the DEC Firefly workstation
- Firefly (key exchange protocol), a cryptographic protocol developed by NSA
