= LSQ =

LSQ may refer to:

- Les Stewart Quartet, a predecessor of the band The Quarrymen
- Load-Store Queue, a structure used by some computer CPUs' memory disambiguation mechanisms
- Agua Santa Airport (IATA airport code: LSQ), Los Ángeles, Chile
- Quebec Sign Language (Langue des signes québécoise), a sign language used in Canada
- Lone Scout Quill, a grade of scouting of the Lone Scouts of America
- Least squares, a technique of equation fitting
