= Xiaoyuan Tu =

Chinese computer scientist

- Born: 1967 (age 58–59)
- Education: Tsinghua University; McMaster University; University of Toronto
- Scientific career
- Fields: Computer science

Xiaoyuan Tu (born 1967) is a Chinese researcher and computer scientist specializing in machine learning, behavior modeling, physics modeling, biomechanical modeling, motion control interfaces, and intelligent virtual characters. She holds a Ph.D. in computer science from University of Toronto and currently serves as a lead scientist and software engineer at Apple Inc, researching and developing next generation motions control and recognition technology.

== Education ==
Tu attended Tsinghua University where she earned BEng in control theory and information science. She then continued her education at McMaster University earning her MSc in computer science with a focus on algorithms for parallel computation between the years 1990 and 1991. Immediately thereafter she enrolled in University of Toronto where she completed her Ph.D. in computer science in 1996 as well as the ACM Doctoral Dissertation Award for her dissertation "Artificial Animals for Computer Animation: Biomechanics, Locomotion, Perception, and Behavior". She is both the first woman and the first Canadian academic to receive this award.

== Industry ==
After completing her Ph.D, Tu spent a brief period of time at Silicon Graphics as a researcher and at Stanford University as a guest lecturer prior to being hired at Intel as a research scientist. There she worked to research and develop a 3D animation testbed for the creation of intelligent virtual characters. In addition to this she was the lead developer on an interactive commerce interface.

In May 2000 she left her position at Intel to create the company AiLive Inc with Wei Yen. There she assumed the role of co-founder, lead scientist and product manager, working to implement machine learning algorithms as middleware in video games. Additionally, she worked to implement LiveMotion, a program focused on motion recognition, tracking and control in games. This technology was used in the creation of Nintendo's Wii MotionPlus controller and helped enable a generation of motion controlled games for the platform.

After leaving AiLive Inc in December 2009 she entered a position at Apple where she currently works to develop and implement motion recognition and control in next-generation iOS devices. Projects she has been instrumental in designing and implementing include:

- Orientation Recognition
- Raise to Talk
- iOS Motion Activity Classification
- Compass Algorithms
- iOS CoreMotion Technology

In her time at Apple she has also been credited as an inventor on several patents filed by Apple including AirDrop data encryption, improvement to Magnetometer mapping on iOS devices, as well as Apple CarPlay automation.

== Awards ==
- ACM Doctoral Dissertation Award — "Artificial Animals for Computer Animation: Biomechanics, Locomotion, Perception, and Behavior"
- Technical Excellence Award from the Canadian Academy of Multimedia and Arts

== Books ==
- Artificial animals for computer animation (1999)
