= Bob Rau =

Computer engineer (1951–2002)

Bob Rau

Bantwal Ramakrishna "Bob" Rau (1951 – December 10, 2002) was a computer engineer and HP Fellow. Rau was a founder and chief architect of Cydrome, where he helped develop the very long instruction word (VLIW) technology, that is now common in modern computer processors. Rau was the recipient of the 2002 Eckert–Mauchly Award. The IEEE Computer Society established the "B. Ramakrishna Rau Award" in his memory. Past recipients include major contributors to the microarchitecture field.
