= Wei Yen =

Chinese-American software developer and entrepreneur

- 顏維群
- Born: 1952 (age 73–74); Taiwan, Republic of China
- Education: Purdue University
- Occupations: Technologist and Entrepreneur

Wei Yen (Chinese: 顏維群; pinyin: Yán Wéiqún) is a Taiwanese-American technologist and entrepreneur known for his contributions to computer graphics and consumer electronics. He has founded or led several technology companies, including ArtX, iQue, and AiLive, and has held executive or board positions at major firms such as Silicon Graphics, ATI Technologies, and Acer Inc. Over the course of his career, Yen played a central role in the development of hardware and software components for several Nintendo platforms, including the Nintendo 64, GameCube, Wii, and associated online services.

Yen earned a Ph.D. in electrical engineering from Purdue University, with a focus on operating systems and artificial intelligence. Early in his career, he co-authored a paper on cache coherence in multiprocessor systems with his brother, David Yen, and their advisor, King-sun Fu.

== Career ==
Yen began his career at Cydrome as director of software engineering, working alongside his brother David Yen, who was director of hardware engineering. The pair were instrumental in developing the Cydra-5, a mini-supercomputer featuring a VLIW ECL-based processor and a multiprocessor bus architecture supported by their cache coherence protocol.

From 1988 to 1996, Yen served as senior vice president at Silicon Graphics (SGI), where he oversaw the development of OpenGL and was also president of SGI’s subsidiary, MIPS Technologies. During his tenure, he contributed to the creation of "Project Reality", which became the Nintendo 64, where he was credited with primary responsibility for designing the critical graphics processing system.

In 1996, Yen founded TVsoft, later renamed Navio, which developed interactive television software. Navio merged with Oracle's Network Computer division and subsequently went public in 1999 as Liberate Technologies. At its peak, Liberate Technologies was valued at $12 billion.

In the late 1990s, Yen founded ArtX, a semiconductor firm staffed by former SGI engineers. The company developed the "Flipper" graphics chip for Nintendo's GameCube. In 2000, ATI Technologies acquired ArtX for approximately $400 million, and Yen later joined ATI’s board.

In 2000, Yen co-founded AiLive, which developed tools for Nintendo's Wii Remote and Wii MotionPlus.

In 2002, Yen co-founded iQue, a joint venture with Nintendo to distribute the company's video game products in mainland China.

Yen later founded BroadOn, which was renamed iGware, a cloud computing firm that provided services to Nintendo for the Nintendo DS, Wii, Nintendo 3DS, and Wii U. In 2011, Acer acquired iGware for $320 million, and the company was renamed Acer Cloud Technology. Yen remained at the helm following the acquisition. As a result of the deal, Yen became Acer's second-largest shareholder, after founder Stan Shih.

Yen has served on the boards of several technology companies, including ATI, Acer, MoSys, and others.
