= AiLive =

Software company based in Mountain View, California

AiLive Inc.
- Type: Private
- Industry: Computer Software
- Founded: April 13, 2000
- Founder: Wei Yen; Xiaoyuan Tu
- Headquarters: Mountain View, California, United States
- Products: LiveMove; Wii MotionPlus; LiveMove 2

AiLive Inc. (formerly iKuni) is a software company based in Mountain View, California, United States. The company was co-founded in 2000 by software programmer and developer Wei Yen and by computer engineer Xiaoyuan Tu. The company has worked closely with Nintendo on the development of motion-sensing hardware, tools and software for the Wii video game console.

AiLive is responsible for the LiveMove series of products. The system was introduced in 2006, using machine learning technology to facilitate the development of motion recognition packages for individual games. Developers were able to use the software to build classifiers from provided examples of specific motions to be included in each game. The LiveMove system was used for the development of games for the Wii. Though initially released for professional developers of Wii games, the software was designed for use by independent developers as well, to expand the possibilities of the new console and Wii Remote interface.

== Wii MotionPlus ==
AiLive developed the Wii MotionPlus. The device added short-term 3D position tracking and long-term 3D orientation tracking to the Wii Remote motion controller. Initially provided as a dongle, the technology has since been integrated into all new Wii Remote controllers carrying the logo Wii MotionPlus Inside. The Wii MotionPlus was initially shipped in a bundle with Wii Sports Resort. Nintendo shipped more than 29 million units globally, making it the sixth best-selling game of all time. In addition to the Wii MotionPlus device concept, AiLive developed and patented the motion tracking algorithms for the device and made them available to developers through the LiveMove 2 software.

== LiveMove 2 ==
A new version of the software, LiveMove 2, was announced on July 7, 2008. Similar to the previous version, LiveMove 2 was developed specifically to work with Nintendo hardware. In this case, the software is a development tool for use with the Wii MotionPlus attachment that AiLive had co-developed. On June 2, 2009, following the unveiling of PlayStation Move at Electronic Entertainment Expo 2009, AiLive announced the release of LiveMove 2 for PlayStation 3. Through a partnership between AiLive and Sony, the LiveMove 2 software was made available to all registered PlayStation 3 developers.
