= Cydra-5 =

1987 supercomputer

The Cydra-5 departmental supercomputer is the first minisupercomputer designed by Cydrome. It was completed in 1987. At that time Cydra-5 cost from $0.5 million to $1 million but achieved one-half the performance of contemporary supercomputers which cost around 10 times as much, $10 million to $20 million.

The Cydra-5 is a heterogeneous multiprocessing system. There are two types of processors functionally specialized for different components of workload. The numerical processor works on numerical computations and uses Cydrome’s "directed-dataflow" architecture, a variant of VLIW. The general-purpose processor is based around the Motorola 68020 processor, and works on non-numerical instructions to keep the numerical processor free from that work. However, these two processors share memory and peripherals, and the operating system manages both, so the user is presented with the illusion of a uniprocessor system.

== Design philosophy ==
The host processor/attached processor approach was rejected because of its performance limitations.
