= Agua Santa Airport =

Airport in Chile

- IATA: none; ICAO: SCAG

Summary
- Airport type: Public
- Location: Palmilla, Chile
- Elevation AMSL: 476 ft (145 m)
- Coordinates: 34°33′05″S 71°20′08″W

Map
- Location of Agua Santa Airport in Chile

Runways
| Direction | Length | | Surface |
| Direction | m | ft | Surface |
|---|---|---|---|
| 18/36 | 1,002 | 3,287 | Grass |
- Source: Landings.com Google Maps GCM

Agua Santa Airport (Spanish: Aeropuerto Agua Santa), (ICAO: SCAG) is an airport serving Palmilla, a town in the O'Higgins Region of Chile. The airport is 9 kilometres (5.6 mi) north of Santa Cruz.

There is a mountain ridge less than 1 kilometre (0.62 mi) off the south end of the runway.

== See also ==
- Transport in Chile
- List of airports in Chile
