= ACM Transactions on Computation Theory =

Academic journal

- Discipline: Theory of computation
- Language: English
- Edited by: Prahladh Harsha

Publication details
- History: 2009–present
- Publisher: ACM (United States)
- Frequency: Quarterly
- Impact factor: 0.7 (2022)

Standard abbreviations
- ISO 4: ACM Trans. Comput. Theory

Indexing
- ISSN: 1942-3454 (print); 1942-3462 (web)

Links
- Journal homepage; Online access; Online archive

ACM Transactions on Computation Theory (ACM ToCT) is a quarterly peer-reviewed scientific journal devoted to the study of computational complexity theory and allied fields. It was established in 2009 and is published by the Association for Computing Machinery, a premier scientific and educational society on computer science and computational technology in the United States.

The editor-in-chief is Prahladh Harsha. (Tata Institute of Fundamental Research).

== Abstracting and indexing ==
The journal is abstracted and indexed in the Science Citation Index Expanded, and Scopus. According to the Journal Citation Reports, the journal has a 2022 impact factor of 0.7.

== Past editors ==
The following persons have been editors-in-chief of the journal:

- Lance Fortnow (2009–2010)
- Eric Allender (2010–2017)
- Venkatesan Guruswami (2017–2019)
- Ryan O'Donnell (2020–2022)
- Prahladh Harsha (2023–)
