= Tomasulo =

Tomasulo is a surname. Notable people with the name include:

- Antonio Tomasulo (1917–1987), Italian-American mobster
- Dan Tomasulo (born 1951), American counseling psychologist, writer, and professor
- Frank P. Tomasulo, American film critic, theoretician, and historian
- Peter Tomasulo (born 1981), American professional golfer
- Robert Tomasulo (1934–2008), American computer scientist
  - Tomasulo's algorithm, a computer architecture hardware algorithm for dynamic scheduling of instructions

== See also ==
- Steve Tomasula, American novelist, critic, short story, and essay author
