= IBM 2395 Processor Storage =

The IBM 2395 Processor Storage is a memory storage unit that was a component of the IBM System/360 Model 91 and Model 95.

Despite the name, IBM 2395 Processor Storage was used for more Model 91s than for Model 95s; the Model 95 used thin-film memory for the first 1MB of memory, and only two Model 95 machines were produced.

== Models ==
There were 2 models of the 2395: the Model 1 supplied 2 megabytes of memory, and the Model 2 had 4 MB.

== Other use by IBM of 2395 ==
- iSeries 9406-820 (processor 2395)
- IBM 95Y2395 - FC5022 2-PORT 16GB FC ADPT
