= IBM System/360 Model 91 =

High-end IBM computer model from 1960s

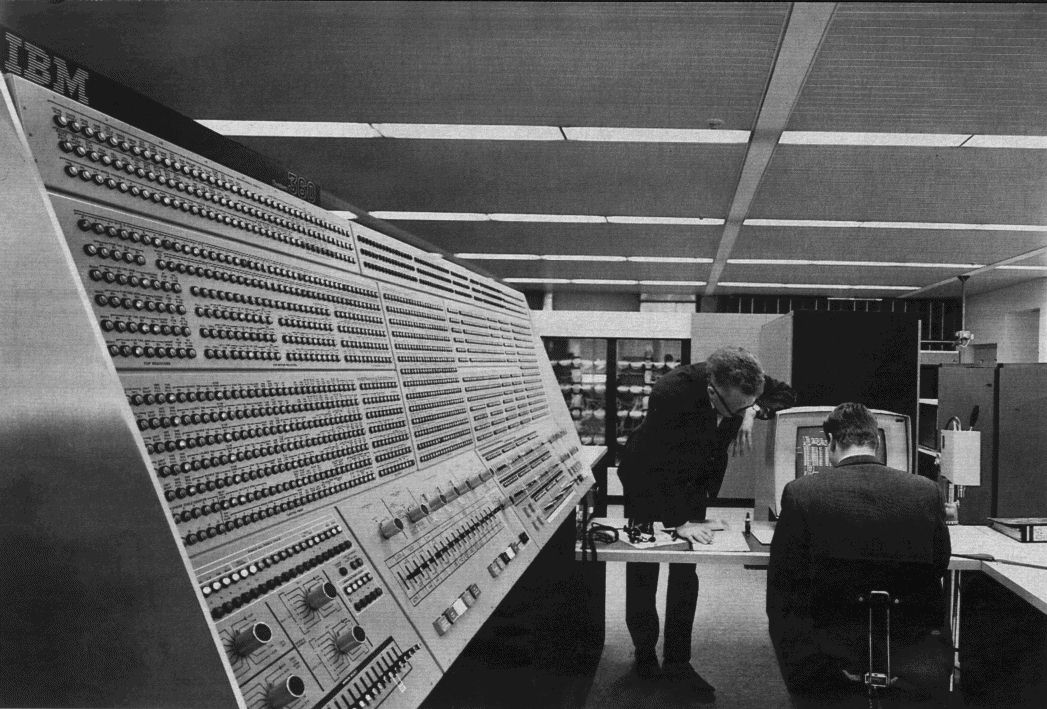
- System/360 Model 91 Panel at the Goddard Space Flight Center
- Developer: IBM
- Released: January 1966
- Predecessor: IBM 7090
- Successor: IBM S/360 Model 195

The IBM System/360 Model 91 was announced in 1964 as a competitor to the CDC 6600. Functionally, the Model 91 ran like any other large-scale System/360, but the internal organization was the most advanced of the System/360 line, and it was the first IBM computer to support out-of-order instruction execution. It ran OS/360 as its operating system. It was designed to handle high-speed data processing for scientific applications. This included space exploration, theoretical astronomy, sub-atomic physics and global weather forecasting.

The first Model 91 was used at the NASA Goddard Space Flight Center in 1968 and at the time was the most powerful computer in user operation. It was capable of executing up to 16.6 million instructions per second, making it roughly equivalent to an Intel 80486SX-20 MHz CPU or AMD 80386DX-40 MHz CPU in MIPS performance.

The CPU consisted of five autonomous units: instruction, floating-point, fixed-point, and two storage controllers for the overlapping memory units and the I/O data channels. The floating-point unit made heavy use of instruction pipelining and was the first implementation of Tomasulo's algorithm. It was also one of the first computers to utilize multi-channel memory architecture.

Castells-Rufas et al. reported that the 360/91 used 74 kW of power.

== Models ==
There were four models of the IBM System/360 Model 91. They differed by their main memory configuration, all using IBM's 2395 Processor Storage.

The 91K had 2 MB, using one 2395 Model 1.

Both the 91KK and the 91L came with 4 MB of main memory: the former used a pair of 2395 Model 1s, the latter a single 2395 Model 2.

The 6 MB KL was equipped with one Model 1 and one Model 2 IBM 2395s.

=== Models built ===
There were only 15 Model 91s ever produced, four of which were for IBM's internal use. After quoting from Pugh et al, William H. Blair says "Many disagree on the number of 360/91s that IBM built or sold. I have read and heard it authoritatively stated that the number was 10, 11, 12, 14, 15, or 20." As for those delivered to customers, "a 360/85 was delivered from when a 91 was ordered until it was ready."

=== Differences from standard System/360 behaviour ===
Because of the emphasis on speed, there were some minor differences in the system's behaviour:

1. Floating-point divide results could differ in the least significant bit.
2. Some exceptions were imprecise.
3. The handling of floating-point underflow and overflow was different, although arguably better.
4. Memory stores could occur out of sequence. A memory barrier instruction was added to allow control of this where necessary.

== IBM and NASA ==
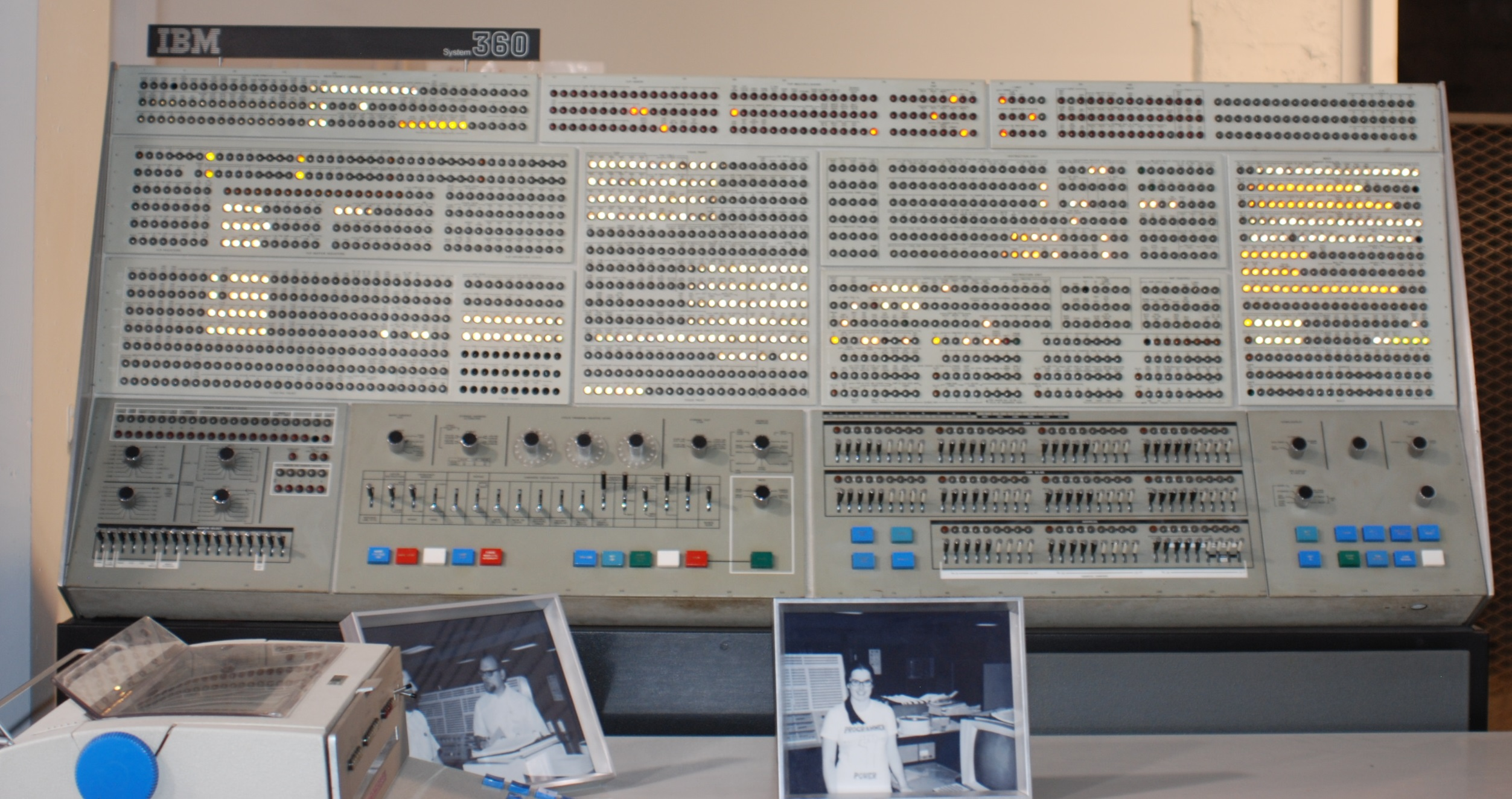
Front panel of the Model 91, formerly on display at the defunct Living Computer Museum in Seattle, Washington

IBM had a long history with NASA including the use of IBM components on crewed space flights such as the IBM ASC-15 on Saturn 1, the IBM ASC-15B on the Titan Family, IBM GDC on Gemini, IBM LVDC on Saturn 1B/5, IBM System/4 Pi-EP on the MOL, and the IBM System/4 Pi-TC 1 on the Apollo Telescope Mount and Skylab.

The Model 91 was shipped 9 months late to the Goddard Space Flight Center in October 1967 and did not begin regular operations until January 1968 after it passed the federal government operations testing.

=== IBM System/360 Model 95 ===
The Model 95 was a variant of the Model 91 with 1 megabyte of thin-film memory and 4 megabytes of core memory. NASA acquired the only two 360/95s ever built.

The console of the Model 95, for which no Functional Characteristics manuals exist, was identical to that of the 360/91.

== First internet connected server ==
In 1971, UCLA used an IBM 360/91 to provide "production computing services" to ARPANET. The services it provided included job submittal, a "mailbox" system and FTP.

== In popular culture ==
There is a Model 91 Panel that was on display at the defunct Living Computer Museum in Seattle, Washington, that was borrowed and featured in the movie Tomorrowland (2015).
