= Classic RISC pipeline =

Instruction pipeline

In the history of computer hardware, some early reduced instruction set computer central processing units (RISC CPUs) used a very similar architectural solution, now called a classic RISC pipeline. Those CPUs were: MIPS, SPARC, Motorola 88000, and later the notional CPU DLX invented for education.

Each of these classic scalar RISC designs fetches and tries to execute one instruction per cycle. The main common concept of each design is a five-stage execution instruction pipeline. During operation, each pipeline stage works on one instruction at a time. Each of these stages consists of a set of flip-flops to hold state, and combinational logic that operates on the outputs of those flip-flops.

== The classic five stage RISC pipeline ==
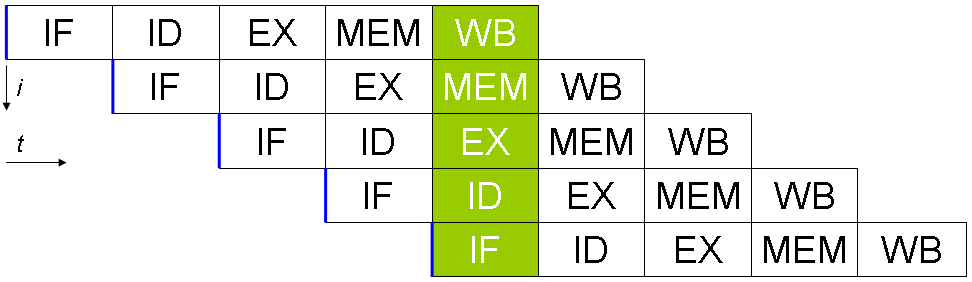
Basic five-stage pipeline in a RISC machine (IF = Instruction Fetch, ID = Instruction Decode, EX = Execute, MEM = Memory access, WB = Register write back). The vertical axis is successive instructions; the horizontal axis is time. So in the green column, the earliest instruction is in WB stage, and the latest instruction is undergoing instruction fetch.

=== Instruction fetch ===
The instructions reside in memory that takes one cycle to read. This memory can be dedicated to SRAM, or an Instruction Cache. The term "latency" is used in computer science often and means the time from when an operation starts until it completes. Thus, instruction fetch has a latency of one clock cycle (if using single-cycle SRAM or if the instruction was in the cache). Thus, during the Instruction Fetch stage, a 32-bit instruction is fetched from the instruction memory.

The program counter (PC) is a register that holds the address that is presented to the instruction memory. The address is presented to instruction memory at the start of a cycle. Then during the cycle, the instruction is read out of instruction memory, and at the same time, a calculation is done to determine the next PC. The next PC is calculated by incrementing the PC by 4, and by choosing whether to take that as the next PC or to take the result of a branch/jump calculation as the next PC. Note that in classic RISC, all instructions have the same length. (This is one thing that separates RISC from CISC). In the original RISC designs, the size of an instruction is 4 bytes, so always add 4 to the instruction address, but don't use PC + 4 for the case of a taken branch, jump, or exception (see delayed branches, below). (Note that some modern machines use more complicated algorithms (branch prediction and branch target prediction) to guess the next instruction address.)

=== Instruction decode ===
Another thing that separates the first RISC machines from earlier CISC machines is that RISC has no microcode. In the case of CISC micro-coded instructions, once fetched from the instruction cache, the instruction bits are shifted down the pipeline, where simple combinational logic in each pipeline stage produces control signals for the datapath directly from the instruction bits. In those CISC designs, very little decoding is done in the stage traditionally called the decode stage. A consequence of this lack of decoding is that more instruction bits have to be used to specify what the instruction does. That leaves fewer bits for things like register indices.

All MIPS, SPARC, and DLX instructions have at most two register inputs. During the decode stage, the indexes of these two registers are identified within the instruction, and the indexes are presented to the register memory, as the address. Thus the two registers named are read from the register file. In the MIPS design, the register file had 32 entries.

At the same time the register file is read, instruction issue logic in this stage determines if the pipeline is ready to execute the instruction in this stage. If not, the issue logic causes both the Instruction Fetch stage and the Decode stage to stall. On a stall cycle, the input flip flops do not accept new bits, thus no new calculations take place during that cycle.

If the instruction decoded is a branch or jump, the target address of the branch or jump is computed in parallel with reading the register file. The branch condition is computed in the following cycle (after the register file is read), and if the branch is taken or if the instruction is a jump, the PC in the first stage is assigned the branch target, rather than the incremented PC that has been computed. Some architectures made use of the Arithmetic logic unit (ALU) in the Execute stage, at the cost of slightly decreased instruction throughput.

The decode stage ended up with quite a lot of hardware: MIPS has the possibility of branching if two registers are equal, so a 32-bit-wide AND tree runs in series after the register file read, making a very long critical path through this stage (which means fewer cycles per second). Also, the branch target computation generally required a 16 bit add and a 14 bit incrementer. Resolving the branch in the decode stage made it possible to have just a single-cycle branch mis-predict penalty. Since branches were very often taken (and thus mis-predicted), it was very important to keep this penalty low.

=== Execute ===
The Execute stage is where the actual computation occurs. Typically this stage consists of an ALU, and also a bit shifter. It may also include a multiple cycle multiplier and divider.

The ALU is responsible for performing Boolean operations (and, or, not, nand, nor, xor, xnor) and also for performing integer addition and subtraction. Besides the result, the ALU typically provides status bits such as whether or not the result was 0, or if an overflow occurred.

The bit shifter is responsible for shift and rotations.

Instructions on these simple RISC machines can be divided into three latency classes according to the type of the operation:

- Register-Register Operation (Single-cycle latency): Add, subtract, compare, and logical operations. During the execute stage, the two arguments were fed to a simple ALU, which generated the result by the end of the execute stage.
- Memory Reference (Two-cycle latency). All loads from memory. During the execute stage, the ALU added the two arguments (a register and a constant offset) to produce a virtual address by the end of the cycle.
- Multi-cycle Instructions (Many cycle latency). Integer multiply and divide and all floating-point operations. During the execute stage, the operands to these operations were fed to the multi-cycle multiply/divide unit. The rest of the pipeline was free to continue execution while the multiply/divide unit did its work. To avoid complicating the writeback stage and issue logic, multicycle instruction wrote their results to a separate set of registers.

=== Memory access ===
If data memory needs to be accessed, it is done in this stage.

During this stage, single cycle latency instructions simply have their results forwarded to the next stage. This forwarding ensures that both one and two cycle instructions always write their results in the same stage of the pipeline so that just one write port to the register file can be used, and it is always available.

For direct mapped and virtually tagged data caching, the simplest by far of the numerous data cache organizations, two SRAMs are used, one storing data and the other storing tags.

=== Writeback ===
During this stage, both single cycle and two cycle instructions write their results into the register file. Note that two different stages are accessing the register file at the same time—the decode stage is reading two source registers, at the same time that the writeback stage is writing a previous instruction's destination register. On real silicon, this can be a hazard (see below for more on hazards). That is because one of the source registers being read in decode might be the same as the destination register being written in writeback. When that happens, then the same memory cells in the register file are being both read and written the same time. On silicon, many implementations of memory cells will not operate correctly when read and written at the same time.

== Hazards ==
Hennessy and Patterson coined the term hazard for situations where instructions in a pipeline would produce wrong answers.

=== Structural hazards ===
Structural hazards occur when two instructions might attempt to use the same resources at the same time. Classic RISC pipelines avoided these hazards by replicating hardware. In particular, branch instructions could have used the ALU to compute the target address of the branch. If the ALU were used in the decode stage for that purpose, an ALU instruction followed by a branch would have seen both instructions attempt to use the ALU simultaneously. It is simple to resolve this conflict by designing a specialized branch target adder into the decode stage.

=== Data hazards ===
Data hazards occur when an instruction, scheduled blindly, would attempt to use data before the data is available in the register file.

In the classic RISC pipeline, Data hazards are avoided in one of two ways:

==== Solution A. Bypassing ====
Bypassing is also known as operand forwarding.

Suppose the CPU is executing the following piece of code:

SUB r3,r4 -> r10     ; Writes r3 - r4 to r10
AND r10,r3 -> r11    ; Writes r10 & r3 to r11

The instruction fetch and decode stages send the second instruction one cycle after the first. They flow down the pipeline as shown in this diagram:

In a naive pipeline, without hazard consideration, the data hazard progresses as follows:

In cycle 3, the SUB instruction calculates the new value for r10. In the same cycle, the AND operation is decoded, and the value of r10 is fetched from the register file. However, the SUB instruction has not yet written its result to r10. Write-back of this normally occurs in cycle 5 (green box). Therefore, the value read from the register file and passed to the ALU (in the Execute stage of the AND operation, red box) is incorrect.

Instead, we must pass the data that was computed by SUB back to the Execute stage (i.e. to the red circle in the diagram) of the AND operation before it is normally written-back. The solution to this problem is a pair of bypass multiplexers. These multiplexers sit at the end of the decode stage, and their flopped outputs are the inputs to the ALU. Each multiplexer selects between:

1. A register file read port (i.e. the output of the decode stage, as in the naive pipeline): red arrow
2. The current register pipeline of the ALU (to bypass by one stage): blue arrow
3. The current register pipeline of the access stage (which is either a loaded value or a forwarded ALU result, this provides bypassing of two stages): purple arrow. Note that this requires the data to be passed backwards in time by one cycle. If this occurs, a bubble must be inserted to stall the AND operation until the data is ready.

Decode stage logic compares the registers written by instructions in the execute and access stages of the pipeline to the registers read by the instruction in the decode stage, and cause the multiplexers to select the most recent data. These bypass multiplexers make it possible for the pipeline to execute simple instructions with just the latency of the ALU, the multiplexer, and a flip-flop. Without the multiplexers, the latency of writing and then reading the register file would have to be included in the latency of these instructions.

Note that the data can only be passed forward in time - the data cannot be bypassed back to an earlier stage if it has not been processed yet. In the case above, the data is passed forward (by the time the AND is ready for the register in the ALU, the SUB has already computed it).

==== Solution B. Pipeline interlock ====
However, consider the following instructions:

LD  adr    -> r10
AND r10,r3 -> r11

The data read from the address adr is not present in the data cache until after the Memory Access stage of the LD instruction. By this time, the AND instruction is already through the ALU. To resolve this would require the data from memory to be passed backwards in time to the input to the ALU. This is not possible. The solution is to delay the AND instruction by one cycle. The data hazard is detected in the decode stage, and the fetch and decode stages are stalled - they are prevented from flopping their inputs and so stay in the same state for a cycle. The execute, access, and write-back stages downstream see an extra no-operation instruction (NOP) inserted between the LD and AND instructions.

This NOP is termed a pipeline bubble since it floats in the pipeline, like an air bubble in a water pipe, occupying resources but not producing useful results. The hardware to detect a data hazard and stall the pipeline until the hazard is cleared is called a pipeline interlock.

Bypassing backwards in time	Problem resolved using a bubble

A pipeline interlock does not have to be used with any data forwarding, however. The first example of the SUB followed by AND and the second example of LD followed by AND can be solved by stalling the first stage by three cycles until write-back is achieved, and the data in the register file is correct, causing the correct register value to be fetched by the AND's Decode stage. This causes quite a performance hit, as the processor spends a lot of time processing nothing, but clock speeds can be increased as there is less forwarding logic to wait for.

This data hazard can be detected quite easily when the program's machine code is written by the compiler. The Stanford MIPS machine relied on the compiler to add the NOP instructions in this case, rather than having the circuitry to detect and (more taxingly) stall the first two pipeline stages. Hence the name MIPS: Microprocessor without Interlocked Pipeline Stages. It turned out that the extra NOP instructions added by the compiler expanded the program binaries enough that the instruction cache hit rate was reduced. The stall hardware, although expensive, was put back into later designs to improve instruction cache hit rate, at which point the acronym no longer made sense.

=== Control hazards ===
Control hazards are caused by conditional and unconditional branching. The classic RISC pipeline resolves branches in the decode stage, which means the branch resolution recurrence is two cycles long. There are three implications:

- The branch resolution recurrence goes through quite a bit of circuitry: the instruction cache read, register file read, branch condition compute (which involves a 32-bit compare on the MIPS CPUs), and the next instruction address multiplexer.
- Because branch and jump targets are calculated in parallel to the register read, RISC ISAs typically do not have instructions that branch to a register+offset address. Jump to register is supported.
- On any branch taken, the instruction immediately after the branch is always fetched from the instruction cache. If this instruction is ignored, there is a one cycle per taken branch IPC penalty, which is adequately large.

There are four schemes to solve this performance problem with branches:

- Predict Not Taken: Always fetch the instruction after the branch from the instruction cache, but only execute it if the branch is not taken. If the branch is not taken, the pipeline stays full. If the branch is taken, the instruction is flushed (marked as if it were a NOP), and one cycle's opportunity to finish an instruction is lost.
- Branch Likely: Always fetch the instruction after the branch from the instruction cache, but only execute it if the branch was taken. The compiler can always fill the branch delay slot on such a branch, and since branches are more often taken than not, such branches have a smaller IPC penalty than the previous kind.
- Branch Delay Slot: Depending on the design of the delayed branch and the branch conditions, it is determined whether the instruction immediately following the branch instruction is executed even if the branch is taken. Instead of taking an IPC penalty for some fraction of branches either taken (perhaps 60%) or not taken (perhaps 40%), branch delay slots take an IPC penalty for those branches into which the compiler could not schedule the branch delay slot. The SPARC, MIPS, and MC88K designers designed a branch delay slot into their ISAs.
- Branch Prediction: In parallel with fetching each instruction, guess if the instruction is a branch or jump, and if so, guess the target. On the cycle after a branch or jump, fetch the instruction at the guessed target. When the guess is wrong, flush the incorrectly fetched target.

Delayed branches were controversial, first, because their semantics are complicated. A delayed branch specifies that the jump to a new location happens after the next instruction. That next instruction is the one unavoidably loaded by the instruction cache after the branch.

Delayed branches have been criticized as a poor short-term choice in ISA design:

- Compilers typically have some difficulty finding logically independent instructions to place after the branch (the instruction after the branch is called the delay slot), so that they must insert NOPs into the delay slots.
- Superscalar processors, which fetch multiple instructions per cycle and must have some form of branch prediction, do not benefit from delayed branches. The Alpha ISA left out delayed branches, as it was intended for superscalar processors.
- The most serious drawback to delayed branches is the additional control complexity they entail. If the delay slot instruction takes an exception, the processor has to be restarted on the branch, rather than that next instruction. Exceptions then have essentially two addresses, the exception address and the restart address, and generating and distinguishing between the two correctly in all cases has been a source of bugs for later designs.

== Exceptions ==
Suppose a 32-bit RISC processes an ADD instruction that adds two large numbers, and the result does not fit in 32 bits.

The simplest solution, provided by most architectures, is wrapping arithmetic. Numbers greater than the maximum possible encoded value have their most significant bits chopped off until they fit. In the usual integer number system, 3000000000+3000000000=6000000000. With unsigned 32 bit wrapping arithmetic, 3000000000+3000000000=1705032704 (6000000000 mod 2^32). This may not seem terribly useful. The largest benefit of wrapping arithmetic is that every operation has a well defined result.

But the programmer, especially if programming in a language supporting large integers (e.g. Lisp or Scheme), may not want wrapping arithmetic. Some architectures (e.g. MIPS), define special addition operations that branch to special locations on overflow, rather than wrapping the result. Software at the target location is responsible for fixing the problem. This special branch is called an exception. Exceptions differ from regular branches in that the target address is not specified by the instruction itself, and the branch decision is dependent on the outcome of the instruction.

The most common kind of software-visible exception on one of the classic RISC machines is a TLB miss.

Exceptions are different from branches and jumps, because those other control flow changes are resolved in the decode stage. Exceptions are resolved in the writeback stage. When an exception is detected, the following instructions (earlier in the pipeline) are marked as invalid, and as they flow to the end of the pipe their results are discarded. The program counter is set to the address of a special exception handler, and special registers are written with the exception location and cause.

To make it easy (and fast) for the software to fix the problem and restart the program, the CPU must take a precise exception. A precise exception means that all instructions up to the excepting instruction have been executed, and the excepting instruction and everything afterwards have not been executed.

To take precise exceptions, the CPU must commit changes to the software visible state in the program order. This in-order commit happens very naturally in the classic RISC pipeline. Most instructions write their results to the register file in the writeback stage, and so those writes automatically happen in program order. Store instructions, however, write their results to the Store Data Queue in the access stage. If the store instruction takes an exception, the Store Data Queue entry is invalidated so that it is not written to the cache data SRAM later.

== Cache miss handling ==
Occasionally, either the data or instruction cache does not contain a required datum or instruction. In these cases, the CPU must suspend operation until the cache can be filled with the necessary data, and then must resume execution. The problem of filling the cache with the required data (and potentially writing back to memory the evicted cache line) is not specific to the pipeline organization, and is not discussed here.

There are two strategies to handle the suspend/resume problem. The first is a global stall signal. This signal, when activated, prevents instructions from advancing down the pipeline, generally by gating off the clock to the flip-flops at the start of each stage. The disadvantage of this strategy is that there are a large number of flip flops, so the global stall signal takes a long time to propagate. Since the machine generally has to stall in the same cycle that it identifies the condition requiring the stall, the stall signal becomes a speed-limiting critical path.

Another strategy to handle suspend/resume is to reuse the exception logic. The machine takes an exception on the offending instruction, and all further instructions are invalidated. When the cache has been filled with the necessary data, the instruction that caused the cache miss restarts. To expedite data cache miss handling, the instruction can be restarted so that its access cycle happens one cycle after the data cache is filled.

== See also ==
- Iron law of processor performance
