= Operand forwarding =

CPU optimization technique to improve instruction-level parallelism

Operand forwarding (or data forwarding, register bypass) is an optimization in pipelined CPUs to limit performance deficits which occur due to pipeline stalls caused by data hazards. A data hazard can lead to a pipeline stall when the current operation has to wait for the results of an earlier operation which has not yet finished.

It is very common that an instruction requires a value computed by the immediately preceding instruction. It may take a few clock cycles to write a result to the register file and then read it back for the subsequent instruction. To improve performance, the register file write/read is bypassed. The result of an instruction is forwarded directly to the execute stage of a subsequent instruction.

== Example ==
ADD A B C  #A=B+C
SUB D C A  #D=C-A

If these two assembly pseudocode instructions run in a pipeline, after fetching and decoding the second instruction, the pipeline stalls, waiting until the result of the addition is written and read.

Without operand forwarding
1	2	3	4	5	6	7	8
Fetch ADD	Decode ADD	Read Operands ADD	Execute ADD	Write result			
	Fetch SUB	Decode SUB	stall	stall	Read Operands SUB	Execute SUB	Write result

With operand forwarding
1	2	3	4	5	6	7
Fetch ADD	Decode ADD	Read Operands ADD	Execute ADD	Write result		
	Fetch SUB	Decode SUB	stall	Read Operands SUB: use result from previous operation	Execute SUB	Write result

In some cases all stalls from such read-after-write data hazards can be eliminated by operand forwarding:

With operand forwarding (enhanced)
1	2	3	4	5	6
Fetch ADD	Decode ADD	Read Operands ADD	Execute ADD	Write result	
	Fetch SUB	Decode SUB	Read Operands SUB: use result from previous operation	Execute SUB	Write result

== Technical realization ==
The CPU control unit must implement logic to detect dependencies where operand forwarding makes sense. A multiplexer can then be used to select the proper register or flip-flop to read the operand from.

== See also ==
- Feed forward (control)
