= Comparison of instruction set architectures =

An instruction set architecture (ISA) is an abstract model of a computer, also referred to as computer architecture. A realization of an ISA is called an implementation. An ISA permits multiple implementations that may vary in performance, physical size, and monetary cost (among other things); because the ISA serves as the interface between software and hardware, software that has been written or compiled for an ISA can run on different implementations of the same ISA. This has enabled binary compatibility between different generations of computers to be easily achieved, and the development of computer families. Both of these developments have helped to lower the cost of computers and to increase their applicability. For these reasons, the ISA is one of the most important abstractions in computing today.

An ISA defines everything a machine language programmer needs to know in order to program a computer. What an ISA defines differs between ISAs; in general, ISAs define the supported data types, what state there is (such as the main memory and registers) and their semantics (such as the memory consistency and addressing modes), the instruction set (the set of machine instructions that comprises a computer's machine language), and the input/output model.

== Data representation ==
In the early decades of computing, there were computers that used binary, decimal and even ternary. Contemporary computers are almost exclusively binary.

Characters are encoded as strings of bits or digits, using a wide variety of character sets; even within a single manufacturer there were character set differences.

Integers are encoded with a variety of representations, including sign-magnitude, ones' complement, two's complement, offset binary, nines' complement and ten's complement.

Similarly, floating-point numbers are encoded with a variety of representations for the sign, exponent and mantissa. In contemporary machines IBM hexadecimal floating-point and IEEE 754 floating point have largely supplanted older formats.

Addresses are typically unsigned integers generated from a combination of fields in an instruction, data from registers and data from storage; the details vary depending on the architecture.

=== Bits ===
Computer architectures are often described as n-bit architectures. In the first three quarters of the 20th century, n was often 12, 18, 24, 30, 36, 48 or 60. In the last third of the 20th century, n was often 8, 16, or 32, and in the 21st century, n is often 16, 32 or 64, but other sizes have been used (including 6, 39, 128). This is actually a simplification as computer architecture often has a few more or less "natural" data sizes in the instruction set, but the hardware implementation of these may be very different. Many instruction set architectures have instructions that, on some implementations of that instruction set architecture, operate on half and/or twice the size of the processor's major internal datapaths. Examples of this are the Z80, MC68000, and the IBM System/360. On these types of implementations, a twice as wide operation typically also takes around twice as many clock cycles (which is not the case on high performance implementations). On the 68000, for instance, this means 8 instead of 4 clock ticks, and this particular chip may be described as a 32-bit architecture with a 16-bit implementation. The IBM System/360 instruction set architecture is 32-bit, but several models of the System/360 series, such as the IBM System/360 Model 30, have smaller internal data paths, while others, such as the 360/195, have larger internal data paths.

The external databus width is not used to determine the width of the architecture; the NS32008, NS32016 and NS32032 were basically the same 32-bit chip with different external data buses. IBM's PowerPC 604 has a 64-bit bus but only 32-bit registers. The System/360 processors, and some early 32-bit microprocessors such as the Motorola 68000, have 24-bit addresses.

The bit width of instructions in an architecture is not necessarily the bit width of the architecture. For example, instructions in System/360, the PDP-11 architecture, the VAX architecture, and the x86 architecture are variable-length. Initial versions of SuperH had fixed-length 16-bit instructions in spite of having a 32-bit architecture, while later versions had both 16-bit and 32-bit instructions.

=== Digits ===
In the first three quarters of the 20th century, word-oriented decimal computers typically had 10-digit words with a separate sign, (Note: Normally the sign could only be plus or minus, but on the IBM 7070/72/74 there was a 3-state sign.) using all ten digits in integers and using two digits for exponents in floating point numbers.

=== Endianness ===
An architecture may use "big" or "little" endianness, or both, or be configurable to use either. Little-endian processors order bytes in memory with the least significant byte of a multi-byte value in the lowest-numbered memory location. Big-endian architectures instead arrange bytes with the most significant byte at the lowest-numbered address. The x86 architecture as well as several 8-bit architectures are little-endian. Most RISC architectures (SPARC, Power, PowerPC, MIPS) were originally big-endian (ARM was little-endian), but many (including ARM) are now configurable as either.

Endianness only applies to processors that allow individual addressing of units of data (such as bytes) that are smaller than some of the data formats.

== Instruction formats ==
=== Opcodes ===
In some architectures, an instruction has a single opcode. In others, some instructions have an opcode and one or more modifiers. E.g., on the IBM System/370, byte 0 is the opcode but when byte 0 is a B2_{16} then byte 1 selects a specific instruction, e.g., B205_{16} is store clock (STCK). On some instruction set architectures, one or more opcode prefixes are used to alter the subsequent opcode or expand the number of opcodes.

=== Operands ===
==== Addressing modes ====
Architectures typically allow instructions to include some combination of operand addressing modes:

Direct
The instruction specifies a complete address
Immediate
The instruction specifies a value rather than an address
Indexed
The instruction specifies a register to use as an index. In some architecture the index is scaled by the operand length.
Indirect
The instruction specifies the location of a pointer word that describes the operand, possibly involving multiple levels of indexing and indirection
Truncated
The instruction specifies the low order bits and a register provides the high order bits.
Base-displacement
The instruction specifies a displacement from an address in a register
autoincrement/autodecrement
A register used for indexing, or a pointer word used by indirect addressing, is incremented or decremented by 1, an operand size or an explicit delta

Vector processors have offered additional modes unique to element-based operations.

==== Number of operands ====
The number of operands is one of the factors that may give an indication about the performance of the instruction set. A three-operand architecture (2-in, 1-out) will allow

A := B + C

to be computed in one instruction

ADD B, C, A

A two-operand architecture (1-in, 1-in-and-out) will allow

A := A + B

to be computed in one instruction

ADD B, A

but requires that

A := B + C

be done in two instructions

MOVE B, A
ADD C, A

=== Encoding length ===
As can be seen in the table below some instructions sets keep to a very simple fixed encoding length, and other have variable-length. Usually it is RISC architectures that have fixed encoding length and CISC architectures that have variable length, but not always.

== Instruction sets ==
The table below compares basic information about instruction set architectures.

Notes:

- Usually the number of registers is a power of two, e.g. 8, 16, 32. In some cases a hardwired-to-zero pseudo-register is included, as "part" of register files of architectures, mostly to simplify indexing modes. The column "Registers" only counts the integer "registers" usable by general instructions at any moment. Architectures always include special-purpose registers such as the program counter (PC). Those are not counted unless mentioned. Note that some architectures, such as SPARC, have register windows; for those architectures, the count indicates how many registers are available within a register window. Also, non-architected registers for register renaming are not counted.
- In the "Type" column, "Register–Register" is a synonym for a common type of architecture, "load–store", meaning that no instruction can directly access memory except some special ones, i.e. load to or store from register(s), with the possible exceptions of memory locking instructions for atomic operations.
- In the "Endianness" column, "Bi" means that the endianness is configurable.

Architecture	Bits	Version	Introduced	Max # operands	Type	Design	Registers (excluding FP/vector)	Instruction encoding	Branch evaluation	Endianness	Extensions	Open	Royalty free
6502	8		1975	1	Register–Memory	CISC	3	Variable (8- to 24-bit)	Condition register	Little			
6800	8		1974	1	Register–Memory	CISC	3	Variable (8- to 24-bit)	Condition register	Big			
6809	8		1978	1	Register–Memory	CISC	4	Variable (8- to 32-bit)	Condition register	Big			
680x0	32		1979	2	Register–Memory	CISC	8 data and 8 address	Variable	Condition register	Big			
8080	8		1974	2	Register–Memory	CISC	7	Variable (8 to 24 bits)	Condition register	Little			
8051	32 (8→32)		1980	1	Register–Register	CISC	32 in 4-bit; 16 in 8-bit; 8 in 16-bit; 4 in 32-bit	Variable (8 to 24 bits)	Compare and branch	Little			
x86	16, 32, 64 (16→32→64)	v4 (x86-64)	1978	2 (integer); 3 (AVX) (Note: The LEA (all processors) and IMUL-immediate (80186 & later) instructions accept three operands; most other instructions of the base integer ISA accept no more than two operands.); 4 (FMA4 and VPBLENDVPx)	Register–Memory	CISC	8 (+ 4 or 6 segment reg.) (16/32-bit); 16 (+ 2 segment reg. gs/cs) (64-bit); 32 with AVX-512 and Advance Performance eXtension (apx)	Variable (8086 ~ 80386: variable between 1 and 6 bytes /w MMU + intel SDK, 80486: 2 to 5 bytes with prefix, pentium and onward: 2 to 4 bytes with prefix, x64: 4 bytes prefix, third party x86 emulation: 1 to 15 bytes w/o prefix & MMU . SSE/MMX: 4 bytes /w prefix AVX: 8 Bytes /w prefix)	Condition code	Little	x87, IA-32, MMX, 3DNow!, SSE, SSE2, PAE, x86-64, SSE3, SSSE3, SSE4, BMI, AVX, AES, FMA, XOP, F16C, AMX	No	No
Alpha	64		1992	3	Register–Register	RISC	32 (including "zero")	Fixed (32-bit)	Condition register	Bi	MVI, BWX, FIX, CIX	No	
ARC	16/32/64 (32→64)	ARCv3	1996	3	Register–Register	RISC	16 or 32 including SP user can increase to 60	Variable (16- or 32-bit)	Compare and branch	Bi	APEX User-defined instructions		
ARM/A32	32	ARMv1–v9	1983	3	Register–Register	RISC	15	Fixed (32-bit)	Condition code	Bi	NEON, Jazelle, VFP, TrustZone, LPAE		No
Thumb/T32	32	ARMv4T-ARMv8	1994	3	Register–Register	RISC	7 with 16-bit Thumb instructions; 15 with 32-bit Thumb-2 instructions	Thumb: Fixed (16-bit), Thumb-2: Variable (16- or 32-bit)	Condition code	Bi	NEON, Jazelle, VFP, TrustZone, LPAE		No
Arm64/A64	64	v8.9-A/v9.4-A, Armv8-R	2011	3	Register–Register	RISC	32 (including the stack pointer/"zero" register)	Fixed (32-bit), Variable (32-bit or 64-bit for FMA4 with 32-bit prefix)	Condition code	Bi	SVE and SVE2		No
AVR	8		1997	2	Register–Register	RISC	32; 16 on "reduced architecture"	Variable (mostly 16-bit, four instructions are 32-bit)	Condition register, skip conditioned on an I/O or general purpose register bit, compare and skip	Little			
AVR32	32	Rev 2	2006	2–3		RISC	15	Variable		Big	Java virtual machine		
Blackfin	32		2000	3	Register–Register	RISC	2 accumulators 8 data registers 8 pointer registers 4 index registers 4 buffer registers	Variable (16- or 32-bit)	Condition code	Little			
CDC Upper 3000 series	48		1963	3	Register–Memory	CISC	48-bit A reg., 48-bit Q reg., 6 15-bit B registers, miscellaneous	Variable (24- or 48-bit)	Multiple types of jump and skip	Big			
CDC 6000; Central Processor (CP)	60		1964	3	Register–Register	N/A (Note: partly RISC: load/store architecture and simple addressing modes, partly CISC: three instruction lengths and no single instruction timing)	24 (8 18-bit address reg., 8 18-bit index reg., 8 60-bit operand reg.)	Variable (15-, 30-, or 60-bit)	Compare and branch	N/A (Note: Since memory is an array of 60-bit words with no means to access sub-units, big endian vs. little endian makes no sense. The optional CMU unit uses big-endian semantics.)	Compare/Move Unit	No	No
CDC 6000; Peripheral Processor (PP)	12		1964	1 or 2	Register–Memory	CISC	1 18-bit A register, locations 1–63 serve as index registers for some instructions	Variable (12- or 24-bit)	Test A register, test channel	N/A (Note: Since memory is an array of 12-bit words with no means to access sub-units, big endian vs. little endian makes no sense.)	additional Peripheral Processing Units	No	No
Crusoe (native VLIW)	32		2000	1	Register–Register	VLIW	1 in native push stack mode; 6 in x86 emulation + 8 in x87/MMX mode + 50 in rename status; 12 integer + 48 shadow + 4 debug in native VLIW; mode	Variable (64- or 128-bit in native mode, 15 bytes in x86 emulation)	Condition code	Little			
Elbrus 2000 (native VLIW)	64	v6	2007	1	Register–Register	VLIW	8–64	64	Condition code	Little	Just-in-time dynamic translation: x87, IA-32, MMX, SSE, SSE2, x86-64, SSE3, AVX	No	No
DLX	32	?	1990	3	Register–Register	RISC	32	Fixed (32-bit)	Condition register	Big	?	Yes	?
eSi-RISC	16/32		2009	3	Register–Register	RISC	8–72	Variable (16- or 32-bit)	Compare and branch and condition register	Bi	User-defined instructions	No	No
iAPX 432	32		1981	3	Stack machine	CISC	0	Variable (6 to 321 bits)				No	No
Itanium (IA-64)	64		2001		Register–Register	EPIC	128	Fixed (128-bit bundles with 5-bit template tag and 3 instructions, each 41-bit long)	Condition register	Bi (selectable)	Intel Virtualization Technology	No	No
LoongArch	32, 64		2021	4	Register–Register	RISC	32 (including "zero")	Fixed (32-bit)		Little		No	No
M32R	32		1997	3	Register–Register	RISC	16	Variable (16- or 32-bit)	Condition register	Bi			
m88k	32		1988	3	Register–Register	RISC	32	Fixed (32-bit)	Compare and branch	Big			
Mico32	32	?	2006	3	Register–Register	RISC	32	Fixed (32-bit)	Compare and branch	Big	User-defined instructions	Yes	Yes
MIPS	64 (32→64)	6	1981	1–3	Register–Register	RISC	4–32 (including "zero")	Fixed (32-bit)	Condition register	Bi	MDMX, MIPS-3D	No	No
MMIX	64	?	1999	3	Register–Register	RISC	256	Fixed (32-bit)	Condition register	Big	?	Yes	Yes
Nios II	32	?	2000	3	Register–Register	RISC	32	Fixed (32-bit)	Condition register	Little	Soft processor that can be instantiated on an Altera FPGA device	No	On Altera/Intel FPGA only
Nova	16		1969	2	Register–Register	CISC	4	Fixed (16-bit)	Skip	None			
NS320xx	32		1982	5	Memory–Memory	CISC	8	Variable Huffman coded, up to 23 bytes long	Condition code	Little	BitBlt instructions		
OpenRISC	32, 64	1.4	2000	3	Register–Register	RISC	16 or 32	Fixed	Condition code	Bi	?	Yes	Yes
PA-RISC (HP/PA)	64 (32→64)	2.0	1986	3	Register–Register	RISC	32	Fixed (32-bit)	Compare and branch	Big → Bi	MAX	No	
PDP-5 PDP-8	12		1963		Register–Memory	CISC	1 accumulator 1 multiplier quotient register	Fixed (12-bit)	Condition register Test and branch		EAE (Extended Arithmetic Element)		
PDP-11	16		1970	2	Memory–Memory	CISC	8 (includes program counter and stack pointer, though any register can act as stack pointer)	Variable (16-, 32-, or 48-bit)	Condition code	Little	Extended Instruction Set, Floating Instruction Set, Floating Point Processor, Commercial Instruction Set	No	No
POWER, PowerPC, Power ISA	32/64 (32→64)	3.1	1990	3 (mostly). FMA, LD/ST-Update	Register–Register	RISC	32 GPR, 8 4-bit Condition Fields, Link Register, Counter Register	Fixed (32-bit), Variable (32- or 64-bit with the 32-bit prefix)	Condition code, Branch-Counter auto-decrement	Bi	AltiVec, APU, VSX, Cell, Floating-point, Matrix Multiply Assist	Licensed by OPF	Only if licensed
RISC-V	32, 64, 128	20250508	2010	3	Register–Register	RISC	32 (including "zero")	Variable	Compare and branch	Little	?	Yes	Yes
RX	64/32/16		2000	3	Memory–Memory	CISC	4 integer + 4 address	Variable	Compare and branch	Little			No
S+core	16/32		2005			RISC				Little			
SPARC	64 (32→64)	OSA2017	1985	3	Register–Register	RISC	32 (including "zero")	Fixed (32-bit)	Condition code	Big → Bi	VIS	Yes	Yes
SuperH (SH)	32	?	1994	2	Register–Register; Register–Memory	RISC	16	Fixed (16- or 32-bit), Variable	Condition code (single bit)	Bi	?	Yes	Yes
System/360; System/370; System/390 z/Architecture	64 (32→64)		1964	2 (most); 3 (FMA, distinct operand facility); 4 (some vector inst.)	Register–Memory; Memory–Memory; Register–Register	CISC	16 general 16 control (S/370 and later); 16 access (ESA/370 and later); 32 vector registers (z13 and later)	Variable (16-, 32-, or 48-bit)	Condition code, compare and branch [auto increment], Branch-Counter auto-decrement	Big		No	No
TMS320 C6000 series	32		1983	3	Register-Register	VLIW	32 on C67x; 64 on C67x+	Fixed (256-bit bundles with 8 instructions, each 32-bit long)	Condition register	Bi		No	No
Transputer	32 (4→64)		1987	1	Stack machine	MISC	3 (as stack)	Fixed (8-bit)	Compare and branch	Little			
VAX	32		1977	6	Memory–Memory	CISC	16	Variable	Condition code, compare and branch	Little		No	
Z80	8		1976	2	Register–Memory	CISC	17	Variable (8 to 32 bits)	Condition register	Little			

== See also ==
- Central processing unit (CPU)
- Processor design
- Comparison of CPU microarchitectures
- Instruction set architecture
- Microprocessor
- Benchmark (computing)
- List of free and open-source EDA software
