= NISC =

NISC may refer to:

- No instruction set computing, an architecture designed for efficiency
- National Invitational Softball Championship, an American collegiate sports tournament
- National center of Incident readiness and Strategy for Cybersecurity, Japan's government institute for cybersecurity
- National Information Solutions Cooperative, information technology cooperative for utility and broadband companies
