= Wide-issue =

Type of computer processor

A wide-issue architecture is a computer processor that issues more than one instruction per clock cycle. They can be considered in three broad types:

- Statically-scheduled superscalar architectures execute instructions in the order presented; the hardware logic determines which instructions are ready and safe to dispatch on each clock cycle.
- VLIW architectures rely on the programming software (compiler) to determine which instructions to dispatch on a given clock cycle.
- Dynamically-scheduled superscalar architectures execute instructions in an order that gives the same result as the order presented; the hardware logic determines which instructions are ready and safe to dispatch on each clock cycle.

== See also ==
- Out-of-order execution
- Explicitly parallel instruction computing
