= One-instruction set computer =

Abstract machine that uses only one instruction

A one-instruction set computer (OISC), sometimes referred to as an ultimate reduced instruction set computer (URISC), is an abstract machine that uses only one instruction – obviating the need for a machine language opcode. With a judicious choice for the single instruction and given arbitrarily many resources, an OISC is capable of being a universal computer in the same manner as traditional computers that have multiple instructions. OISCs have been recommended as aids in teaching computer architecture and have been used as computational models in structural computing research. The first carbon nanotube computer is a 1-bit one-instruction set computer (and has only 178 transistors).

== Machine architecture ==
In a Turing-complete model, each memory location can store an arbitrary integer, and – depending on the mode, there may be arbitrarily many locations. The instructions themselves reside in memory as a sequence of such integers.

There exists a class of universal computers with a single instruction based on bit manipulation such as bit copying or bit inversion. Since their memory model is finite, as is the memory structure used in real computers, those bit manipulation machines are equivalent to real computers rather than to Turing machines.

Currently known OISCs can be roughly separated into three broad categories:

- Bit-manipulating machines
- Transport triggered architecture machines
- Arithmetic-based Turing-complete machines

=== Bit-manipulating machines ===
Bit-manipulating machines are the simplest class.

==== FlipJump ====
The FlipJump machine has 1 instruction, a;b - flips the bit a, then jumps to b. This is the most primitive OISC, but it's still useful. It can successfully do math/logic calculations, branching, pointers, and calling functions with the help of its standard library.

==== BitBitJump ====
A bit copying machine, called BitBitJump, copies one bit in memory and passes the execution unconditionally to the address specified by one of the operands of the instruction. This process turns out to be capable of universal computation (i.e. being able to execute any algorithm and to interpret any other universal machine) because copying bits can conditionally modify the copying address that will be subsequently executed.

==== Toga computer ====
Another machine, called the Toga Computer, inverts a bit and passes the execution conditionally depending on the result of inversion. The unique instruction is TOGA(a,b) which stands for TOGgle a And branch to b if the result of the toggle operation is true.

==== Multi-bit copying machine ====
Similar to BitBitJump, a multi-bit copying machine copies several bits at the same time. The problem of computational universality is solved in this case by keeping predefined jump tables in the memory.

=== Transport triggered architecture ===
Transport triggered architecture (TTA) is a design in which computation is a side effect of data transport. Usually, some memory registers (triggering ports) within common address space perform an assigned operation when the instruction references them. For example, in an OISC using a single memory-to-memory copy instruction, this is done by triggering ports that perform arithmetic and instruction pointer jumps when written to.

=== Arithmetic-based Turing-complete machines ===
Arithmetic-based Turing-complete machines use an arithmetic operation and a conditional jump. Like the two previous universal computers, this class is also Turing-complete. The instruction operates on integers which may also be addresses in memory.

Currently there are several known OISCs of this class, based on different arithmetic operations:

- addition (addleq, add and branch if less than or equal to zero)
- decrement (DJN, Decrement and branch (Jump) if Nonzero)
- increment (P1eq, Plus 1 and branch if equal to another value)
- subtraction (subleq, subtract and branch if less than or equal to zero)
- positive subtraction when possible, else branch (Arithmetic machine)

== Instruction types ==
Common choices for the single instruction are:

- Subtract and branch if less than or equal to zero
- Subtract and branch if negative
- Subtract if positive else branch
- Reverse subtract and skip if borrow
- Move (used as part of a transport triggered architecture)
- Subtract and branch if non zero (SBNZ a, b, c, destination)
- Cryptoleq (heterogeneous encrypted and unencrypted computation)

Only one of these instructions is used in a given implementation. Hence, there is no need for an opcode to identify which instruction to execute; the choice of instruction is inherent in the design of the machine, and an OISC is typically named after the instruction it uses (e.g., an SBN OISC, the SUBLEQ language, etc.). Each of the above instructions can be used to construct a Turing-complete OISC.

This article presents only subtraction-based instructions among those that are not transport triggered. However, it is possible to construct Turing complete machines using an instruction based on other arithmetic operations, e.g., addition. For example, one variation known as DLN (Decrement and jump if not zero) has only two operands and uses decrement as the base operation. For more information see Subleq derivative languages .

=== Subtract and branch if not equal to zero ===
The SBNZ a, b, c, d instruction ("subtract and branch if not equal to zero") subtracts the contents at address a from the contents at address b, stores the result at address c, and then, if the result is not 0, transfers control to address d (if the result is equal to zero, execution proceeds to the next instruction in sequence).

=== Subtract and branch if less than or equal to zero ===
The subleq instruction ("subtract and branch if less than or equal to zero") subtracts the contents at address a from the contents at address b, stores the result at address b, and then, if the result is not positive, transfers control to address c (if the result is positive, execution proceeds to the next instruction in sequence). Pseudocode:

Instruction subleq a, b, c
    Mem[b] = Mem[b] - Mem[a]
    if (Mem[b] ≤ 0)
        goto c

Conditional branching can be suppressed by setting the third operand equal to the address of the next instruction in sequence. If the third operand is not written, this suppression is implied.

A variant is also possible with two operands and an internal accumulator, where the accumulator is subtracted from the memory location specified by the first operand. The result is stored in both the accumulator and the memory location, and the second operand specifies the branch address:

Instruction subleq2 a, b
    Mem[a] = Mem[a] - ACCUM
    ACCUM = Mem[a]
    if (Mem[a] ≤ 0)
        goto b

Although this uses only two (instead of three) operands per instruction, correspondingly more instructions are then needed to effect various logical operations.

==== Synthesized instructions ====
It is possible to synthesize many types of higher-order instructions using only the subleq instruction.

Unconditional branch:

JMP c

  subleq Z, Z, c

Addition can be performed by repeated subtraction, with no conditional branching; e.g., the following instructions result in the content at location a being added to the content at location b:

ADD a, b

  subleq a, Z
  subleq Z, b
  subleq Z, Z

The first instruction subtracts the content at location a from the content at location Z (which is 0) and stores the result (which is the negative of the content at a) in location Z. The second instruction subtracts this result from b, storing in b this difference (which is now the sum of the contents originally at a and b); the third instruction restores the value 0 to Z.

A copy instruction can be implemented similarly; e.g., the following instructions result in the content at location b getting replaced by the content at location a, again assuming the content at location Z is maintained as 0:

MOV a, b

  subleq b, b
  subleq a, Z
  subleq Z, b
  subleq Z, Z

Any desired arithmetic test can be built. For example, a branch-if-zero condition can be assembled from the following instructions:

BEQ b, c

  subleq b, Z, L1
  subleq Z, Z, OUT
L1:
  subleq Z, Z
  subleq Z, b, c
OUT:
  ...

Subleq2 can also be used to synthesize higher-order instructions, although it generally requires more operations for a given task. For example, no fewer than 10 subleq2 instructions are required to flip all the bits in a given byte:

NOT a

  subleq2 tmp          ; tmp = 0 (tmp = temporary register)
  subleq2 tmp
  subleq2 one          ; acc = -1
  subleq2 a            ; a' = a + 1
  subleq2 Z            ; Z = - a - 1
  subleq2 tmp          ; tmp = a + 1
  subleq2 a            ; a' = 0
  subleq2 tmp          ; load tmp into acc
  subleq2 a            ; a' = - a - 1 ( = ~a )
  subleq2 Z            ; set Z back to 0

==== Emulation ====
The following program (written in pseudocode) emulates the execution of a subleq-based OISC:

 int memory[], program_counter, a, b, c
 program_counter = 0
 while (program_counter >= 0):
     a = memory[program_counter]
     b = memory[program_counter+1]
     c = memory[program_counter+2]
     if (a < 0 or b < 0):
         program_counter = -1
     else:
         memory[b] = memory[b] - memory[a]
         if (memory[b] > 0):
             program_counter += 3
         else:
             program_counter = c

This program assumes that memory[] is indexed by nonnegative integers. Consequently, for a subleq instruction (a, b, c), the program interprets a < 0, b < 0, or an executed branch to c < 0 as a halting condition. Similar interpreters written in a subleq-based language (i.e., self-interpreters, which may use self-modifying code as allowed by the nature of the subleq instruction) can be found in the external links below.

A general purpose SMP-capable 64-bit operating system called Dawn OS has been implemented in an emulated Subleq machine. The OS contains a C-like compiler. Some memory areas in the virtual machine are used for peripherals like the keyboard, mouse, hard drives, network card, etc. Basic applications written for it include a media player, painting tool, document reader and scientific calculator.

A 32-bit Subleq computer with a graphic display and a keyboard called Izhora has been constructed by Yoel Matveyev as a large cellular automaton pattern.

==== Compilation ====
There is a compiler called Higher Subleq written by Oleg Mazonka that compiles a simplified C program into subleq code.

Alternatively there is a self hosting Forth implementation written by Richard James Howe that runs on top of a Subleq VM and is capable of interactive programming of the Subleq machine

The Eternal Software Initiative provides a LLVM compiler backend that compiles standard C and C++ programs directly to a minimal Subleq+ VM. It's good enough to run Linux natively on it and preserve it as a "time capsule".

=== Subtract and branch if negative ===
The subneg instruction ("subtract and branch if negative"), also called SBN, is defined similarly to subleq:

Instruction subneg a, b, c
    Mem[b] = Mem[b] - Mem[a]
    if (Mem[b] < 0)
        goto c

Conditional branching can be suppressed by setting the third operand equal to the address of the next instruction in sequence. If the third operand is not written, this suppression is implied.

==== Synthesized instructions ====
It is possible to synthesize many types of higher-order instructions using only the subneg instruction. For simplicity, only one synthesized instruction is shown here to illustrate the difference between subleq and subneg.

Unconditional branch:

JMP c

  subneg POS, Z, c

where Z and POS are locations previously set to contain 0 and a positive integer, respectively;

Unconditional branching is assured only if Z initially contains 0 (or a value less than the integer stored in POS). A follow-up instruction is required to clear Z after the branching, assuming that the content of Z must be maintained as 0.

==== subneg4 ====
A variant is also possible with four operands – subneg4. The reversal of minuend and subtrahend eases implementation in hardware. The non-destructive result simplifies the synthetic instructions.

Instruction subneg s, m, r, j
    (* subtrahend, minuend, result and jump addresses *)
    Mem[r] = Mem[m] - Mem[s]
    if (Mem[r] < 0)
        goto j

=== Arithmetic machine ===
In an attempt to make Turing machine more intuitive, Z. A. Melzak consider the task of computing with positive numbers. The machine has an infinite abacus, an infinite number of counters (pebbles, tally sticks) initially at a special location S. The machine is able to do one operation:

Take from location X as many counters as there are in location Y and transfer them to location Z and proceed to instruction y.

If this operation is not possible because there is not enough counters in X, then leave the abacus as it is and proceed to instruction n.

In order to keep all numbers positive and mimic a human operator computing on a real world abacus, the test is performed before any subtraction. Pseudocode:

Instruction melzak X, Y, Z, n, y
    if (Mem[X] < Mem[Y])
        goto n
    Mem[X] -= Mem[Y]
    Mem[Z] += Mem[Y]
    goto y

After giving a few programs: multiplication, gcd, computing the n-th prime number, representation in base b of an arbitrary number, sorting in order of magnitude, Melzak shows explicitly how to simulate an arbitrary Turing machine on his arithmetic machine.

MUL p, q

multiply:
  melzak P, ONE, S, stop                ; Move 1 counter from P to S. If not possible, move to stop.
  melzak S, Q, ANS, multiply, multiply  ; Move q counters from S to ANS. Move to the first instruction.
stop:

where the memory location P is p, Q is q, ONE is 1, ANS is initially 0 and at the end pq, and S is a large number.

He mentions that it can easily be shown using the elements of recursive functions that every number calculable on the arithmetic machine is computable. A proof of which was given by Lambek on an equivalent two instruction machine : X+ (increment X) and X− else T (decrement X if it not empty, else jump to T).

=== Reverse subtract and skip if borrow ===
In a reverse subtract and skip if borrow (RSSB) instruction, the accumulator is subtracted from the memory location and the next instruction is skipped if there was a borrow (memory location was smaller than the accumulator). The result is stored in both the accumulator and the memory location. The program counter is mapped to memory location 0. The accumulator is mapped to memory location 1.

Instruction rssb x
    ACCUM = Mem[x] - ACCUM
    Mem[x] = ACCUM
    if (ACCUM < 0)
        goto PC + 2

==== Example ====
To set x to the value of y minus z:

# First, move z to the destination location x.
  RSSB temp # Three instructions required to clear acc, temp [See Note 1]
  RSSB temp
  RSSB temp
  RSSB x    # Two instructions clear acc, x, since acc is already clear
  RSSB x
  RSSB y    # Load y into acc: no borrow
  RSSB temp # Store -y into acc, temp: always borrow and skip
  RSSB temp # Skipped
  RSSB x    # Store y into x, acc
# Second, perform the operation.
  RSSB temp # Three instructions required to clear acc, temp
  RSSB temp
  RSSB temp
  RSSB z    # Load z
  RSSB x    # x = y - z [See Note 2]

- [Note 1] If the value stored at "temp" is initially a negative value and the instruction that executed right before the first "RSSB temp" in this routine borrowed, then four "RSSB temp" instructions will be required for the routine to work.
- [Note 2] If the value stored at "z" is initially a negative value then the final "RSSB x" will be skipped and thus the routine will not work.

=== Transport triggered architecture ===
A transport triggered architecture uses only the move instruction, hence it was originally called a "move machine". This instruction moves the contents of one memory location to another memory location combining with the current content of the new location:

Instruction movx a, b (also written a -> b)
    OP = GetOperation(Mem[b])
    Mem[b] := OP(Mem[a], Mem[b])

The operation performed is defined by the destination memory cell. Some cells are specialized in addition, some other in multiplication, etc. So memory cells are not simple store but coupled with an arithmetic logic unit (ALU) setup to perform only one sort of operation with the current value of the cell. Some of the cells are control flow instructions to alter the program execution with jumps, conditional execution, subroutines, if-then-else, for-loop, etc...

A commercial transport triggered architecture microcontroller has been produced called MAXQ, which hides the apparent inconvenience of an OISC by using a "transfer map" that represents all possible destinations for the move instructions.

=== Cryptoleq ===
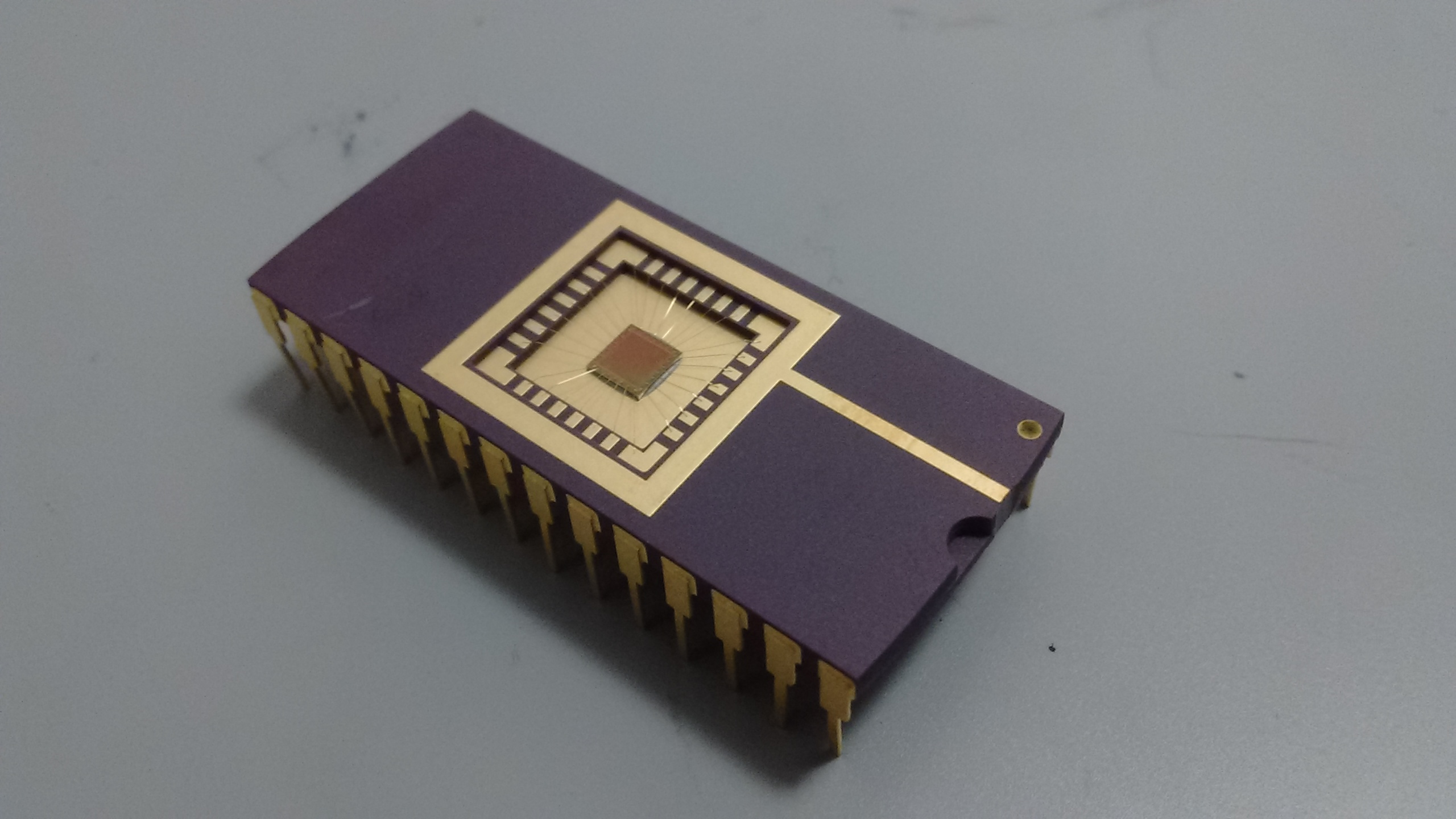
Cryptoleq processor made at NYU Abu Dhabi

Cryptoleq is a language similar to Subleq. It consists of one eponymous instruction and is capable of performing general-purpose computation on encrypted programs. Cryptoleq works on continuous cells of memory using direct and indirect addressing, and performs two operations O_{1} and O_{2} on three values A, B, and C:

Instruction cryptoleq a, b, c
    Mem[b] = O1(Mem[a], Mem[b])
    if O2(Mem[b]) ≤ 0
        IP = c
    else
        IP = IP + 3

where a, b and c are addressed by the instruction pointer, IP, with the value of IP addressing a, IP + 1 point to b and IP + 2 to c.

In Cryptoleq operations O_{1} and O_{2} are defined as follows:

$$\begin{array}{lcl} O_1(x,y) & = & x^{-1} y \,\bmod\, N^2  \end{array}$$

$$\begin{array}{lcl} O_2(x) & = & \left \lfloor \frac{x-1}{N} \right \rfloor  \end{array}$$

The main difference with Subleq is that in Subleq, O_{1}(x,y) simply subtracts y from x and O_{2}(x) equals to x. Cryptoleq is also homomorphic to Subleq, modular inversion and multiplication is homomorphic to subtraction and the operation of O_{2} corresponds the Subleq test if the values were unencrypted. A program written in Subleq can run on a Cryptoleq machine, meaning backwards compatibility. However, Cryptoleq implements fully homomorphic calculations and is capable of multiplications. Multiplication on an encrypted domain is assisted by a unique function G that is assumed to be difficult to reverse engineer and allows re-encryption of a value based on the O_{2} operation:

$$G(x,y) = \begin{cases} \tilde{0}, & \text{if }O_2(\bar{x})\text{ }\leq 0 \\ \tilde{y}, & \text{otherwise} \end{cases}$$

where $\tilde{y}$ is the re-encrypted value of y and $\tilde{0}$ is encrypted zero. x is the encrypted value of a variable, let it be m, and $\bar{x}$ equals $Nm + 1$.

The multiplication algorithm is based on addition and subtraction, uses the function G and does not have conditional jumps nor branches. Cryptoleq encryption is based on Paillier cryptosystem.

== See also ==
- FRACTRAN
- Minimal axioms for Boolean algebra
- Register machine
- Turing tarpit
- Reduced instruction set computer
- Complex instruction set computer
- Explicitly parallel instruction computing
- Minimal instruction set computer
- Very long instruction word
- Zero instruction set computer
