= Load–store architecture =

Type of instruction set architecture

In computer engineering, a load–store architecture (or a register–register architecture) is an instruction set architecture that divides instructions into two categories: memory access (load and store between memory and registers) and ALU operations (which only occur between registers).

Some RISC architectures such as PowerPC, SPARC, RISC-V, ARM, and MIPS are load–store architectures.

For instance, in a load–store approach, both the operands and the destination for an ADD operation must be in registers. This differs from a register–memory architecture (for example, a CISC instruction set architecture such as x86) in which one of the operands for the ADD operation may be in memory while the other is in a register. The earliest example of a load–store architecture was the CDC 6600. Almost all vector processors (including many GPUs) use the load–store approach.

== See also ==
- Load–store unit
- Register–memory architecture
