= Raymie Stata =

American computer scientist (born 1968)

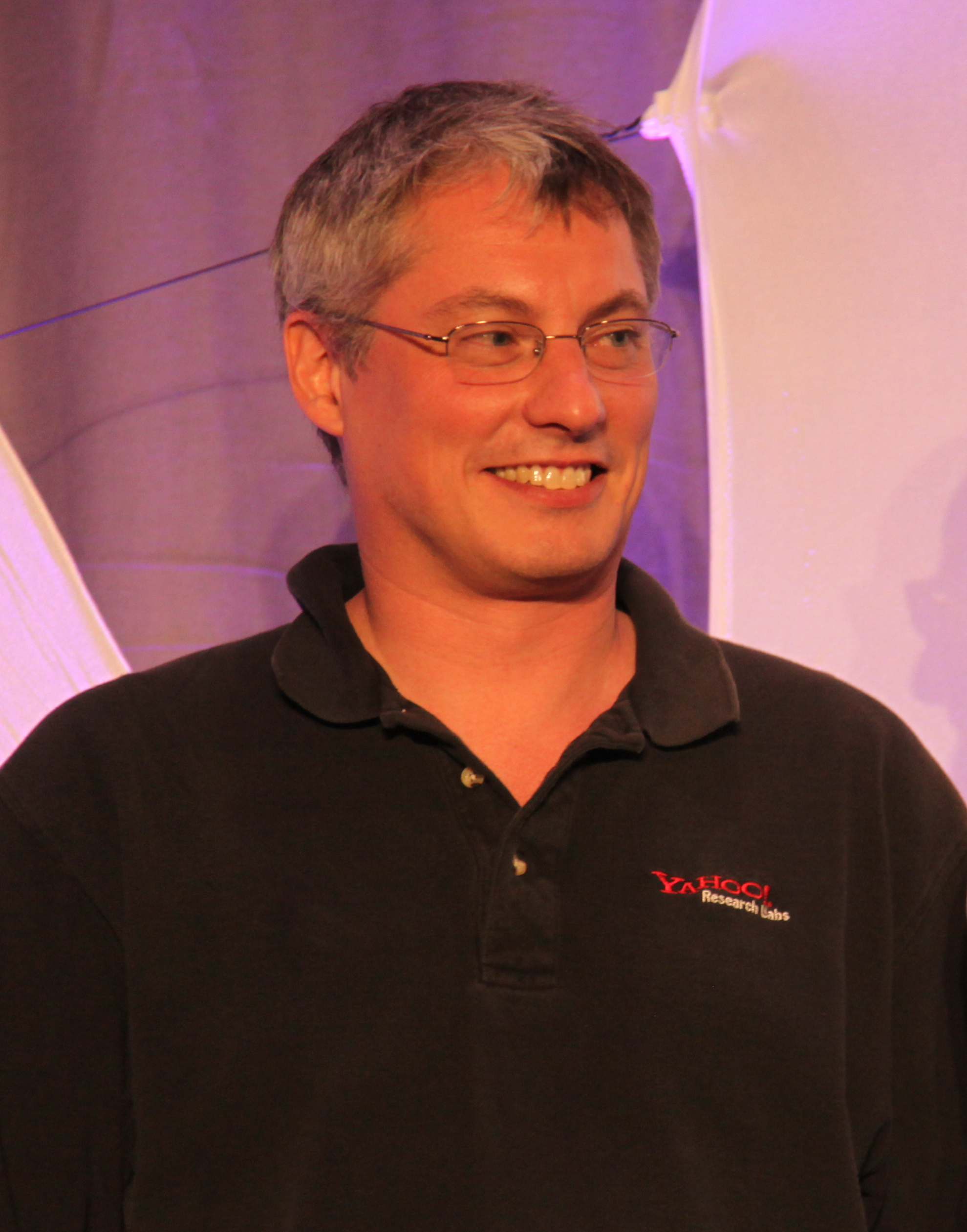
- Stata in 2010
- Born: Raymond Paul Stata; March 27, 1968 (age 58); Brookline, Massachusetts, U.S.
- Education: MIT
- Parents: Ray Stata (father); Maria Stata (mother)
- Relatives: Nicole Stata (sister)
- Scientific career
- Workplaces: Stata Labs; Baskin School of Engineering UC Santa Cruz; Yahoo!; Altiscale; SAP SE
- Thesis: Modularity in the Presence of Subclassing (1996)
- Doctoral advisor: John Guttag

Raymond Paul "Raymie" Stata is an American computer engineer and business executive.

== Early life ==
Stata received his bachelor's and master's degrees in Computer Science and Engineering from MIT, where he also earned his Ph.D. in 1996, under adviser John Guttag.

Stata's father, Ray Stata, was founder and chairman of Analog Devices.

== Career ==
After finishing his Ph.D., Stata worked for Digital Equipment Corporation's Systems Research Center, where he contributed to the AltaVista search engine. He was an assistant professor of Computer Science at the Baskin School of Engineering at UC Santa Cruz, and collaborated with the Internet Archive.

In 2002, Stata founded Stata Laboratories. The company developed the Bloomba search-based e-mail client and the SAProxy anti-spam filter.

Stata Labs was acquired by Yahoo! in 2004, for an undisclosed amount. Stata continued working for Yahoo!, and in 2010, became the company's chief technology officer, a position he held until he left the company in 2012. With Yahoo!, Stata co-developed a composition model for cloud-hosted serving applications, for which he was granted a patent. Stata was also involved early in Apache Hadoop, consulting with and eventually hiring its founders Doug Cutting and Mike Cafarella at Yahoo!.

After leaving Yahoo! in 2012, Stata founded Altiscale, a company that provided Apache Hadoop-as-a-service marketed as "big data in the cloud". Altiscale was named a Cool Vendor in Big Data by Gartner for 2015. Stata was Altiscale's CEO until 2016, when the company was acquired by the software company SAP for more than $125 million. Following SAP's acquisition, Stata became senior vice president of big data services for about a year.

Since 2018, Stata has been the product and technology advisor for Aqfer, an enterprise software company developing data marketing tools. Stata is on the board for technology companies Vanu and Gamalon.

Stata is on the advisory council for QuakeFinder, a research and development group focusing on earthquake prediction. Until 2018, he was on the board of trustees for the Computer History Museum in Mountain View, California.

== Publications ==
- Stata, Raymie; Abadi, Martin (1999-01-01). "A type system for Java bytecode subroutines". ACM Transactions on Programming Languages and Systems. 21 (1): 90–137. CiteSeerX 10.1.1.35.5980. doi:10.1145/314602.314606. ISSN 0164-0925. S2CID 315658.
- Broder, A.; Kumar, R.; Maghoul, F.; Raghavan, P.; Rajagopalan, S.; Stata, R.; Tomkins, A.; Wiener, J. (2000). "Graph structure in the web". WWW Conference. Archived from the original on 2018-01-20.
- Flanagan, Cormac; Leino, K. Rustan M.; Lillibridge, Mark; Nelson, Greg; Saxe, James B.; Stata, Raymie; Flanagan, Cormac; Leino, K. Rustan M.; Lillibridge, Mark (2002). Extended static checking for Java. Vol. 37. pp. 234–245. CiteSeerX 10.1.1.19.162. doi:10.1145/543552.512558. ISBN 978-1581134636. ;
- Kraft, R.; Stata, R. (November 2003). "Finding buying guides with a Web carnivore". Proceedings of the IEEE/LEOS 3rd International Conference on Numerical Simulation of Semiconductor Optoelectronic Devices (IEEE Cat. No.03EX726). pp. 84–92. CiteSeerX 10.1.1.126.485. doi:10.1109/laweb.2003.1250286. ISBN 978-0-7695-2058-2. S2CID 16784456.
