= Gordon Center for Medical Imaging =

- Massachusetts General Hospital

Geography
- Location: 125 Nashua Street, Suite 660 Boston, Massachusetts 02114-1107, Boston, Massachusetts, United States
- Coordinates: 42°21′46.10″N 71°04′07.07″W

Organization
- Affiliated university: Harvard Medical School
- Network: Massachusetts General Hospital

History
- Opened: 2015

Links
- Website: cii.mgb.org
- Lists: Hospitals in Massachusetts

The Gordon Center for Medical Imaging is an American multidisciplinary research center at Massachusetts General Hospital (MGH) and Harvard Medical School that develops biomedical imaging technologies.

The center's central activities include: research, training and education in medical imaging, and translation of basic research into clinical applications.

The MGH Gordon Center also operates the PET Core, an MGH research service facility that synthesizes radiotracers and provides positron emission tomography (PET) imaging services for investigators.

Created in 2015 with an endowment from the Bernard and Sophia Gordon Foundation, the Gordon Center is a direct continuation of MGH's Division of Radiological Sciences where the first positron-imaging device was invented.

Dr. Georges El Fakhri was the founding director of the Gordon Center. The Center is located in two campuses in Boston and Charlestown Navy Yard, Massachusetts. In 2025, the BWH Center for Excellence in Vascular Biology and the MGH Gordon Center for Medical Imaging consolidated into the MGB (Mass General Brigham) Center for Inflammation Imaging, which is co-directed by Dr. Peter Libby and Dr. Matthias Nahrendorf.

== See also ==
- Athinoula A. Martinos Center for Biomedical Imaging
- Massachusetts General Hospital
- Nuclear medicine
- PET
