= Matthew Lorber =

American electrical engineer (1934–2022)

- Born: December 26, 1934; New York State, United States
- Died: October 21, 2022 (aged 87)
- Education: Massachusetts Institute of Technology
- Occupations: Electrical engineer and entrepreneur
- Known for: Develop the inertial navigation system for ballistic missiles and co-founded Analog Devices
- Spouse: Susan Marriott Lorber (m. 1967)

Matthew Lorber (December 26, 1934 – October 21, 2022) was an American electrical engineer and entrepreneur.

== Early life and education ==
Lorber was raised in Brooklyn, New York, with his parents, Jacob and Estelle Lorber, his paternal grandparents, his sisters, and his aunt. He attended Public School 197 and graduated from Freeport High School on Long Island. He received his Bachelors (1956) and Masters (1958) degrees in electrical engineering from the Massachusetts Institute of Technology (MIT). He married Susan Marriott Lorber in 1967.

== Career ==
Lorber joined the MIT Instrumentation Lab, where he helped develop the inertial navigation system for the U.S. Navy's first submarine-launched ballistic missile. He founded Analog Devices with his classmate Ray Stata in 1965. He later founded Copley Controls, acquired by Analogic Corporation in 2008.

== Philanthropy ==
Lorber established the Lorber Family Foundation dedicated to expanding opportunities for those less fortunate.
