= OpenVReg =

Power supply specification

OpenVReg (short for Open Voltage Regulator) is a Nvidia power supply specification. It is an industrial first attempt to standardize both the package and pinout for low voltage DC-DC switching regulators.

The goal of OpenVReg is to enable packaging and pinout compatibility across multiple sources of similar devices with a single common PCB footprint and layout. OpenVReg defines the basic operation, the minimum set of features, the electrical interface and the mechanical requirements necessary to implement compliant devices.

OpenVReg compliant devices have:

- Non-conflicting pinout definitions: additional features are allowed but do not conflict with the base feature set.
- Circuit compatibility: devices function within the predefined reference circuit.
- Common layout: devices are footprint compatible.
- Mechanically compatible package: devices do not exceed the volume defined in the mechanical specification.

The current OpenVreg development focuses exclusively on DC-DC regulators and controllers. Future version may add definition for other types of devices. The current three OpenVReg regulator types are Type 0, Type 2 and Type2+1.

== Types ==
=== Type 0 ===
OpenVReg Type 0 is a step down DC-DC converter with integrated power stage. Type 0 defines three subtypes targeting different applications:

Type0 SubType	Input voltage (V)	Application	Note
Type 0-LV	1.2 ~5.5	Secondary converters in two stage architectures and battery operated devices	fixed input
Type 0-DT	12 V	Generic desktop and consumer electronics	fixed input
Type 0-BT	7–20 V	Battery operated devices with 3 or more cells battery packs	dynamic input

Note: Regulators must be stable with either polymer capacitor or MLCC (Multi-layer ceramic capacitor) input and output capacitor.

=== Type 2 ===
OpenVReg Type 2 is a dual phase DC-DC controller. Type 2 defines two subtypes targeting different applications:

Type0 SubType	Input voltage (V)	Application	Note
Type 2-DT	12 V	Generic desktop and consumer electronics	fixed input
Type 2-BT	7–20 V	Battery operated devices with 3 or more cells battery packs	dynamic input

=== Type 2+1 ===
OpenVReg Type 2+1 is a multi-phase PWM buck switching regulator controller with two integrated gate drivers and an external gate driver to provide the third phase PWM signal output. OpenVReg Type 2+1 is programmable for 1-, 2-, or 3-phase operation. Two subtypes are defined targeting different applications:

Type0 SubType	Input voltage (V)	Application	Note
Type 2+1-DT	12 V	Generic desktop and consumer electronics	fixed input
Type 2+1-BT	7–20 V	Battery operated devices with 3 or more cells battery packs	dynamic input
