= PPI =

PPI may refer to:

== Science and technology ==
=== Biochemistry ===
- PP_{i}, the anion P_{2}O_{7}^{4−}, a pyrophosphate
- Polyproline I helix
- Protein–protein interaction

=== Medicine ===
- Patient and public involvement
- Prepulse inhibition, of a later pulse
- Proton-pump inhibitor, a class of medications
- Psychopathic Personality Inventory, a personality test
- Psychophysiological Interaction, fMRI analysis technique

=== Computing ===
- Parallel Peripheral Interface, of the Blackfin processor
- Programmable Peripheral Interface, Intel 8255 chip
- Programmable Peripheral Interconnect, in Nordic nRF microcontrollers
- Pixels per inch, of a display
- Productivity Products International, commercializer of the Objective-C language

=== Other science and technology ===
- Gabarit passe-partout international, in railways
- Picks per inch, a unit of textile measurement
- Plan position indicator, radar display
- Polymethylene polyphenylene isocyanate

== Business and organizations ==
- Italian People's Party (1919) (Partito Popolare Italiano), a political party
- Italian People's Party (1994) (Partito Popolare Italiano), a political party
- Payment protection insurance
- Peace Party of India, Uttar Pradesh
- Perusahaan Perdagangan Indonesia, trading company
- Philips Phonographische Industries, later Philips Records
- Phonographic Performance Ireland, music licensing company
- Pirate Parties International
- Polly Peck International, former UK company
- PPI Holdings, Inc., a Philippine franchisee of restaurant brands
- Primarily Primates, primate sanctuary, Texas, US
- Productivity Products International, US software company later renamed Stepstone
- Progressive Policy Institute, U.S.
- Pakistan Press International, a news agency

== Other uses ==
- Pareto priority index, to prioritize projects
- Positive polarity item
- Producer price index
- Pulse Polio, immunisation campaign in India
- Port Pirie Airport, IATA airport code "PPI"
