= Paul Brokaw =

Electronic engineer

Paul Brokaw (January 18th 1935 - September 18th 2025) was an expert on integrated circuit design who spent most of his career at Analog Devices, where he held the position of Analog Fellow. He was the inventor of many analog IC circuits, including the Brokaw bandgap reference and holder of over 100 patents. He was also an IEEE Fellow, and recipient of the IEEE Donald O. Pederson Award in Solid-State Circuits.

Born in Minneapolis, Minnesota, he died at home in Tucson, Arizona, aged 90.

== Publications ==
- Brokaw, Paul. An IC Amplifier User's Guide to Decoupling, Grounding, and Making Things Go Right for a Change (PDF) (Report). Application Note (Revision B ed.). Analog Devices. AN-202.

== Awards and honors ==
- 2021 - IEEE Donald O. Pederson Award in Solid-State Circuits
