= Super Harvard Architecture Single-Chip Computer =

Series of digital signal processor chips

SHARC
- Designer: Analog Devices
- Bits: 32-bit
- Introduced: 1999; 26 years ago
- Design: DSP/RISC
- Type: Load–store, Harvard architecture, word-addressed, VLIW
- Encoding: 48-bit
- Branching: ?
- Endianness: Neither

Registers
- ?
- General-purpose: ?

The Super Harvard Architecture Single-Chip Computer (SHARC) is a high performance floating-point and fixed-point DSP from Analog Devices. SHARC is used in a variety of signal processing applications ranging from audio processing, to single-CPU guided artillery shells to 1000-CPU over-the-horizon radar processing computers. The original design dates to about January 1994.

SHARC processors are typically intended to have a good number of serial links to other SHARC processors nearby, to be used as a low-cost alternative to SMP.

== Architecture ==
The SHARC is a Harvard architecture word-addressed VLIW processor; it knows nothing of 8-bit or 16-bit values since each address is used to point to a whole 32-bit word, not just an octet. It is thus neither little-endian nor big-endian, though a compiler may use either convention if it implements 64-bit data and/or some way to pack multiple 8-bit or 16-bit values into a single 32-bit word. In C, the characters are 32-bit as they are the smallest addressable words in the architecture.

The word size is 48-bit for instructions, 32-bit for integers and normal floating-point, and 40-bit for extended floating-point. Code and data are normally fetched from on-chip memory, which the user must split into regions of different word sizes as desired. Small data types may be stored in wider memory, simply wasting the extra space. A system that does not use 40-bit extended floating-point might divide the on-chip memory into two sections, a 48-bit one for code and a 32-bit one for everything else. Most memory-related CPU instructions can not access all the bits of 48-bit memory, but a special 48-bit register is provided for this purpose. The special 48-bit register may be accessed as a pair of smaller registers, allowing movement to and from the normal registers.

Off-chip memory can be used with the SHARC. This memory can only be configured for one single size. If the off-chip memory is configured as 32-bit words to avoid waste, then only the on-chip memory may be used for code execution and extended floating-point. Operating systems may use overlays to work around this problem, transferring 48-bit data to on-chip memory as needed for execution. A DMA engine is provided for this. True paging is impossible without an external MMU.

The SHARC has a 32-bit word-addressed address space. Depending on word size this is 16 GB, 20 GB, or 24 GB (using the common definition of an 8-bit "byte").

SHARC instructions may contain a 32-bit immediate operand. Instructions without this operand are generally able to perform two or more operations simultaneously. Many instructions are conditional, and may be preceded with "if condition " in the assembly language. There are a number of condition choices, similar to the choices provided by the x86 flags register.

There are two delay slots. After a jump, two instructions following the jump will normally be executed.

The SHARC processor has built-in support for loop control. Up to 6 levels may be used, avoiding the need for normal branching instructions and the normal bookkeeping related to loop exit.

The SHARC has two full sets of general-purpose registers. Code can instantly switch between them, allowing for fast context switches between an application and an OS or between two threads.

== Software support ==
Compilers:

- Analog Devices CrossCore compiler (commercial)
- Analog Devices Visual DSP++ (commercial)
- Analog Devices g21k, a defunct fork of GCC (GPLv2)

== See also ==
- TigerSHARC – parallel descendant from Analog Devices
- Blackfin – modern (2000–) replacement from Analog Devices
- Qualcomm Hexagon – competitor
- Texas Instruments TMS320 – competitor
- CEVA, Inc. – competitor
