= Ray Stata =

American electrical engineer

- Born: Raymond Stuart Stata; November 12, 1934 (age 91); Oxford, Pennsylvania, U.S.
- Education: Massachusetts Institute of Technology
- Known for: Analog Devices, Inc.
- Children: Raymie Stata; Nicole Stata
- Website: www.raystata.com

Raymond Stuart Stata (born 1934) is an American entrepreneur, engineer, and investor.

== Early life and education ==
Stata was born on November 12, 1934, in the small farming community of Oxford, Pennsylvania to Rhoda Pearl Buchanan and Raymond Stanford Stata, a self-employed electrical contractor. In high school, Ray worked as an apprentice for his father. Ray's mother was a factory worker. Ray's sister, Joan Stata, was five years older and worked as a nurse in Wilmington, Delaware. In the first grade, Stata attended a one-room school with one teacher serving eight grades. His parents moved to the outskirts of Baltimore to work at an aircraft factory during WWII. Ray attended Oxford High School in Oxford, Pennsylvania. After high school, Stata earned Bachelor of Science and Master's degrees from Massachusetts Institute of Technology (MIT).

Stata married Maria in June, 1962. The two reside in the Boston area, where they raised their son Raymie (born 1968) and daughter Nicole. Raymie graduated from MIT and founded Stata Labs which was acquired by Yahoo in 2004, and in 2010, was named Yahoo's CTO. Nicole graduated from the Grossman School of Business at the University of Vermont and is also an entrepreneur, having started Deploy Solutions, which she sold to Kronos in 2007. She later founded Boston Seed Capital, a seed venture capitalist firm.

== Career ==
In 1965, Ray founded Analog Devices, Inc. with MIT classmate Matthew Lorber in Cambridge, Massachusetts. Before founding Analog Devices, Stata and Lorber, together with Bill Linko, another MIT graduate, founded Solid State Instruments, a company which was acquired by Kollmorgen Corporation. In addition to Analog and Solid State Instruments, Stata is founder of Stata Venture Partners. They were early investors in Nexabit Networks, which in June 1999, was acquired by Lucent for $900M.

Stata is a member of the American Academy of Arts and Sciences and the National Academy of Engineering, and was the recipient of the 2003 IEEE Founders Medal.

=== Industry work ===
Stata co-founded and was the first president of the Massachusetts High Technology Council (MHTC) in 1977. With MHTC, Stata has advocated for engineering education and university research funding as a shared responsibility of government and industry. Stata led MHTC to support government policies to improve the quality of life in Massachusetts.

Stata also worked on the executive committee of the Council on Competitiveness from 1987 to 2005. Stata was on the Malcolm Baldrige National Quality Award Board of Overseers, stemming from his professional commitment to total quality management.

He served on the board of the Semiconductor Industry Association from January 1, 1996, to November 7, 2013, and as the group's chairman in 2011. The group awarded Stata with the Robert N. Noyce Award, the industry's highest honor, in November 2001.

Stata was engaged in the stewardship of MIT, his alma mater, in several roles. He was the chairman of the Visiting Committee of the Department of Electrical Engineering and Computer Science until 2010. In 1984, he was elected to the MIT Corporation and was a member of its executive committee. From 1987 to 1988 he was president of the MIT Alumni Association.

In 1997, Stata contributed $25 million to the construction of a new academic complex on the MIT campus called the Ray and Maria Stata Center. The building was designed by Frank Gehry.

Ray and Maria are life trustees of the Boston Symphony Orchestra. In 1999, Ray and Maria Stata endowed the music director chair position.

Ray Stata is a member of the board of directors for Nano-C, a producer of nanostructured carbon. Stata first invested in Nano-C in 2018 and has made subsequent investments since June 2020.

=== Honors ===
- 1990: Elected to the American Academy of Arts and Sciences
- 1992: Elected to the National Academy of Engineering
- 1996: Named Foreign Fellow of Indian National Academy of Engineering
- 2001: Recipient of the Semiconductor Industry Association's Robert M. Noyce Award for Leadership
- 2003: Recipient of the IEEE Founders Medal
- 2008: Recipient of EE Times "Lifetime Achievement" award
- 2010: MIT Commencement Speaker
- 2025: VLC City Chip Award (Valencia, Spain)

== Publications ==
- Co-author, Global Stakes, Ballinger Press, 1982
- Co-author, The Innovators, Harper & Rowe, 1984
- Published Article in MIT Sloan Management Review (1989), titled: "Organization Learning – The Key to Management Innovation"
- Published Article in CQM Journal (1995), titled: "A Conversation about Conversations"
- Published Article in Arthur D Little, titled: "Organizational Learning: The Key to Success in the 1990s"
