= Silicon bandgap temperature sensor =

Thermometer used in electronic equipment

The silicon bandgap temperature sensor is an extremely common form of temperature sensor (thermometer) used in electronic equipment. Its main advantage is that it can be included in a silicon integrated circuit at very low cost. The principle of the sensor is that the forward voltage of a silicon diode, which may be the base-emitter junction of a bipolar junction transistor (BJT), is temperature-dependent, according to the following equation:

$$V_{BE}=V_{G0}\left(1-{\frac{T}{T_0}}\right)+V_{BE0}\left(\frac{T}{T_0}\right)+
\left(\frac{nkT}{q}\right)\ln\left(\frac{T_0}{T}\right)+
\left(\frac{kT}{q}\right)\ln\left(\frac{I_C}{I_{C0}}\right) \,$$

where

T = temperature in kelvins,
T_{0} = reference temperature,
V_{G0} = bandgap voltage at absolute zero,
V_{BE0} = junction voltage at temperature T_{0} and current I_{C0},
k = Boltzmann constant,
q = charge on an electron,
n = a device-dependent constant that is between 1 and 2 (for abruptly changing doping profile, as in Schottky diodes, it is 2, for infinitely smoothly changing doping profile it is 1, for discrete transistors it is usually near 1.5).

Circuit of a Brokaw bandgap reference

By comparing the voltages of two junctions at the same temperature, but at two different currents, I_{C1} and I_{C2}, many of the variables in the above equation can be eliminated, resulting in the relationship:

$$\Delta V_{BE}=\frac{kT}{q}\cdot\ln\left(\frac{I_{C1}}{I_{C2}}\right) \,$$

Note that the junction voltage is a function of current density, i.e. current/junction area, and a similar output voltage can be obtained by operating the two junctions at the same current, if one is of a different area to the other.

A circuit that forces I_{C1} and I_{C2} to have a fixed N:1 ratio, gives the relationship:

$$\Delta V_{BE}=\frac{kT}{q}\cdot\ln\left(N\right) \,$$

An electronic circuit, such as the Brokaw bandgap reference, that measures ΔV_{BE} can therefore be used to calculate the temperature of the diode. The result remains valid up to about 200 °C to 250 °C, when leakage currents become large enough to corrupt the measurement. Above these temperatures, materials such as silicon carbide can be used instead of silicon.

This Brokaw circuit has 2 imperfections : 1) the amplifier that measures the voltage difference always has some DC offset voltage, and 2) the 2 transistors are not exactly equal, which also manifests as an offset voltage (in a typical IC it is in order of magnitude of 1 mV) . An alternative way of measuring the same thing is to use 1 transistor and switch current through it from a low to a high value (and back, repetitively). Then the bandgap voltage manifests as an AC square wave, which is easy to amplify and not influenced by offset voltages.

It may be interesting to note that, by subtracting above given formula at one current from same formula at a different current, Vgo term has been cancelled out, so that what these circuits measure is nkT/q .

The voltage difference between two p-n junctions (e.g. diodes), operated at different current densities, is proportional to absolute temperature (PTAT).

PTAT circuits using either BJT or CMOS transistors are widely used in temperature sensors (where we want the output to vary with temperature), and also in bandgap voltage references and other temperature-compensating circuits (where we want the same output at every temperature).

If high precision is not required it is enough to bias a diode with any constant low current and use its −2 mV/˚C thermal coefficient for temperature calculation, however this requires calibration for each diode type. This method is common in monolithic temperature sensors.
