= Nicole Stata =

American entrepreneur

Nicole Stata is an American entrepreneur.

== Education and career ==
Stata graduated from the Grossman School of Business at the University of Vermont in 1991. She started her career at Lotus Development Corporation, then managed the global service center for Restrac (later Webhire). She was the co-founder and CEO of Deploy Solutions, a software company concerned with human resources, in 1996. It was acquired by Kronos Incorporated (now Kronos SaaShr) in 2007. From 2008 to 2010, she worked as an angel investor, advisor and COO of Jackpot Rewards.

Stata is co-founder and general partner of Boston Seed Capital. The firm was an early investor in DraftKings and is in turn a partner in the venture capital arm of DraftKings (Drive by DraftKings).

In 2016, Stata was identified as one of 30 most influential people in Boston technology by Boston Magazine. She has given talks on the challenges and opportunities of being a woman entrepreneur.

== Relatives ==
She is the daughter of Ray and Maria Stata and the sister of Raymie Stata.
