= Bloomba =

Email client

- Developer(s): Stata Labs
- Type: Email client
- Website: www.statalabs.com www.isofttech.com

Bloomba was an email client publicly announced February 2003 at IDG's DEMO show. It was released in October 2003. Bloomba's developer, Stata Laboratories (also the producers of the SAProxy anti spam filter) was purchased by Yahoo in October 2004, at which time sales of Bloomba were suspended.

== History ==
In May 2005, Bloomba was licensed to Corel Corporation and re-released as WordPerfect Mail, a component of the WordPerfect Office family. Bloomba's focus was fast searching of email. According to PC Magazine, it was faster than Outlook in searching email. It could be installed beside an installation of Outlook or Eudora without interfering with the operation of the other email client. Bloomba was co-developed by Chennai-based iSoftTech, a software outsourcing firm engaged by Stata Labs.
