= Analog Devices =

American semiconductor manufacturer

Analog Devices, Inc.
- Type: Public
- Traded as: Nasdaq: ADI; Nasdaq-100 component; S&P 500 component
- Industry: Semiconductors
- Founded: 1965; 61 years ago in Cambridge, Massachusetts, U.S.
- Founders: Ray Stata; Matthew Lorber
- Headquarters: Wilmington, Massachusetts, U.S.
- Key people: Vincent Roche (chairman and CEO)
- Products: Semiconductors
- Revenue: ▲US$11.02 billion (2025)
- Operating income: ▲US$2.932 billion (2025)
- Net income: ▲US$2.267 billion (2025)
- Total assets: ▼US$47.99 billion (2025)
- Total equity: ▼US$33.82 billion (2025)
- Number of employees: 24,500 (2025)
- Website: analog.com
- Footnotes; Financials as of November 1, 2025.

Analog Devices, Inc. (ADI), also known simply as Analog, is an American multinational semiconductor company specializing in data conversion, signal processing, and power management technology, headquartered in Wilmington, Massachusetts.

The company manufactures analog, mixed-signal and digital signal processing (DSP) integrated circuits (ICs) used in electronic equipment. These technologies are used to convert, condition and process real-world phenomena, such as light, sound, temperature, motion, and pressure into electrical signals.

Analog Devices has approximately 100,000 customers in the following industries: communications, computer, instrumentation, military/aerospace, automotive, and consumer electronics applications.

== Products and technologies ==
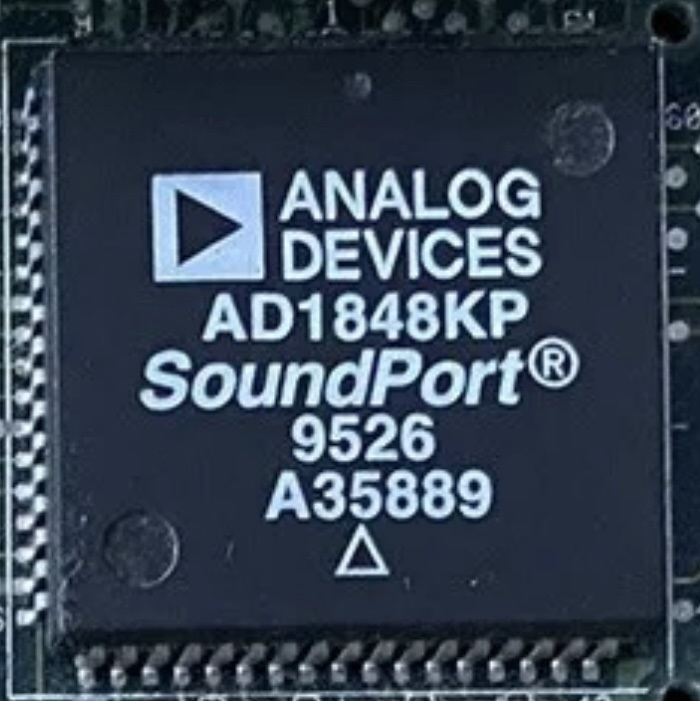
An Analog Devices SoundPort audio I/O integrated circuit, as used in an Ensoniq Soundscape Elite 16 bit PC sound card

Analog Devices products include analog signal processing and digital signal processing technologies. These technologies include data converters, amplifiers, radio frequency (RF) technologies, embedded processors or digital signal processing (DSP) ICs, power management, and interface products.

Data converters include analog-to-digital converters (ADCs) and digital-to-analog converters (DACs) that convert electrical signal representations of real-world analog phenomena, such as light, sound, waveforms, temperature, motion, and pressure into digital signals or data, and back again. Analog Devices ADC and DAC ICs are used in medical systems, scientific instrumentation, wireless and wired communications, radar, industrial process control, audio and video equipment, and other digital-processing-based systems, where an accurate signal conversion is critical. Data converters account for more than 50% of ADI's revenue. ADI's companion amplifier ICs provide accurate, high-speed and precise signals for driving data converters and are key for applications such as digital audio, current sensing, and precision instrumentation.

The company's data converter chips are used by National Instruments in high-precision measurement instrumentation systems. Its data converters and amplifiers are also used by scientists and researchers in project "IceCube" – an underground neutrino telescope that uses digital optical modules (DOMS) to detect subatomic particles in the South Pole.

Power management products for customers in the industrial, wireless infrastructure and digital camera markets support signal chain design requirements, such as dynamic range, transient performance, and reliability.

Interface products include a broad range of interface IC products offered by the company in product categories such as CAN (controller area network), digital isolators, level translators, LVDS, mobile I/O expander and keyboard controller, USB, and RS-232.

Amplifiers includes precision and operational amplifiers, instrumentation, current sense, differential amplifiers, audio amplifiers, video amplifiers/buffers/filters, variable gain amplifiers, comparators, voltage, other specialty amplifiers and products for special linear functions.

Radio frequency integrated circuits (RFICs) address the RF signal chain and simplify RF system development. The company's RF portfolio includes TruPwr RMS power detectors and logarithmic amplifiers; PLL and DDS synthesizers; RF prescalers; variable gain amplifiers; ADC drivers, gain blocks, LNAs and other RF amplifiers.

Processors and DSP are programmable signal processing integrated circuits that execute specialized software programs, or algorithms, associated with processing digitized real-time data. Analog Devices Processors and DSPs are the Blackfin, SHARC, SigmaDSP, TigerSHARC, ADSP-21xx and Precision Analog Microcontrollers. These make up the company's embedded processing and DSP portfolio, that are multi-DSP signal processing,

=== Historical ===
Analog Devices had a line of micro-electromechanical systems (MEMS) microphones until it sold that business to InvenSense in 2013. Analog Devices MEMS microphones were found in smart phones, tablet PCs, security systems, and medical applications. ADI's MEMS accelerometers were designed into game pad controllers by Microsoft, Logitech and Pellican.

== History ==
The company was founded by Ray Stata and Matthew Lorber, two MIT graduates, in 1965. The same year, the company released its first product, the Model 101 operational amplifier (op amp), which was a hockey-puck sized module used in test and measurement equipment. In 1967, the company published the first issue of its technical magazine, Analog Dialogue.

In 1969, Analog Devices filed an initial public offering and became a publicly traded company. Ten years later, the company was listed on the New York Stock Exchange.

In 1973, the company was the first to launch laser trim wafers and the first CMOS digital-to-analog converter. By 1996, the company reported over $1 billion in company revenue. That same year, Jerald Fishman was named president and CEO, a position he held until his death in 2013 (see below).

In 2000, Analog Devices's sales grew by over 75% to $2.578 Billion and the company acquired five companies including BCO Technologies PLC, a manufacturer of thick film semiconductors, for $150 million.

By 2004, Analog Devices had a customer base of 60,000 and its portfolio included over 10,000 products.

In January 2008, ON Semiconductor completed the acquisition of the CPU Voltage and PC Thermal Monitoring Business from Analog Devices., for $184 million.

In 2012, the company led the worldwide data converter market with a 48.5% share, according to analyst firm Databeans. Also, the company moved its listing from the NYSE to Nasdaq effective April 2, 2012.

In July 2016, Analog and Linear Technology agreed that Analog would acquire Linear in an approximately $14.8 billion cash and stock deal.

In July 2020, Analog agreed to acquire Maxim Integrated in an all stock deal that values the combined company at $68 billion.

== Locations ==
Analog Devices is headquartered in Wilmington, Massachusetts, with regional headquarters located in Shanghai, China; Munich, Germany; Limerick, Ireland; and Tokyo, Japan.

Analog Devices has fabrication plants located in the United States and in Ireland. The company's testing facilities are located in General Trias, Philippines; Chonburi, Thailand; and Penang, Malaysia. Design centers are located in Australia, Canada, China, Egypt, England, Germany, India, Italy, Japan, Scotland, Spain, Taiwan, Turkey and the United States.

== Employees ==
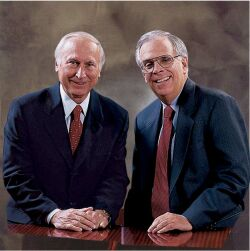
Ray Stata and Jerry Fishman

Raymond Stata is a founder of Analog Devices and was responsible for the business strategy and product roadmap. After founding the company in 1965, Stata served as the company's chairman of the board of directors from 1973 to 2022, CEO from 1973 to 1996 and president from 1971 to 1991. In addition, Stata is also a trustee of the Massachusetts Institute of Technology, his alma mater and was awarded the IEEE Founders medal in 2003. Stata received the EE Times "Lifetime Achievement" award in 2008. Stata served as the chairman of the Semiconductor Industry Association for the year 2011.

Vincent Roche became president and CEO of Analog Devices in May 2013 and chairman of the board in June 2022. He first joined the company in 1988 as a marketing director in Limerick, Ireland.

Barrie Gilbert was named the first Technology Fellow of Analog Devices in 1979. In addition, Gilbert was an IEEE Life Fellow and held over 65 patents. Gilbert is best known for the "Gilbert cell" – an electronic multiplying mixer. At Analog Devices, Gilbert started the company's Northwest Labs design center in Oregon and continued to work on RF products crafted with high-speed nonlinear circuit techniques.

Paul Brokaw is an expert on integrated circuit design who has spent most of his career at Analog Devices, where he holds the position of Analog Fellow. Brokaw is the inventor of many analog IC circuits, including the Brokaw bandgap reference and holds over 100 patents. He is also an IEEE Life Fellow.

Robert Adams is Technical Fellow and manager of audio development at Analog Devices Inc. Adams holds many patents related to the audio and electronic field. He is a member of the IEEE and a Fellow in the Audio Engineering Society. Adams received a finalist ranking for the EDN Innovation and Innovator of the Year award in 1995.

Jerald G. Fishman was the CEO and president of Analog Devices from 1996 until his death on 28 March 2013. In 2004, Fishman was named CEO of the Year by Electronic Business. He was a 35-year veteran of Analog Devices and also served on the board of directors of Analog Devices, Cognex Corporation and Xilinx.

Mahdi Mohammad Sadeghi was fired after his arrest in 2024 on charges of providing material support to a terrorist organization. Sadeghi was accused of evading U.S. sanctions by facilitating indirect sales of technology to the Iranian military, which was used by the Islamic Resistance in Iraq in the Tower 22 drone attack on a U.S. military outpost in 2024.

== Markets ==
=== Healthcare ===
Analog Devices sells linear, mixed-signal, MEMS and digital signal processing technologies for medical imaging, patient monitoring, medical instrumentation and home healthcare. The company's precision signal-processing components and Blackfin digital signal processors are included in Karmelsonix's Wholter, an overnight pulmonary monitor, and the Wheezometer, a personal asthmatic assessment device. Accelerometers produced by Analog Devices are included in ZOLL Medical's PocketCPR, which measures the depth of chest compressions and provides audible and visual feedback to a rescuer to allow adjustment to proper depth and to the correct rate of compression. In March 2024, the company announced that it had received U.S. FDA 510(k) clearance for Sensinel, a compact, wearable, non-invasive remote Cardiopulmonary Management (CPM) System that captures cardiopulmonary measurements for chronic disease management such as heart failure.

=== Automotive ===
Analog Devices develops components for safety systems, such as stability control systems and driver assistance systems, infotainment and interior applications. Powertrain systems in hybrid and electric vehicles use high-precision data conversion products in battery monitoring and control systems. In June 2025, ADI announced the formation of OpenGMSL Association to revolutionize the future on In-Vehicle Connectivity by creating a worldwide standard for transmission of video and high-speed data in the automotive ecosystem.

=== Industrial ===
Analog Devices industrial market includes process control systems that help drive productivity, energy efficiency and reliability.

=== Consumer ===
Analog Devices has technology for consumer electronics, which includes signal processing circuits for image processing, auto focus, and image stabilization for digital still cameras and camcorders, audio and video processors for home theater systems, DVD recorders, and high-definition televisions and advanced touch screen controllers for portable media devices.

== Analog Dialogue ==
In 1967, Analog Devices first published Analog Dialogue. Dan Sheingold took the position of editor two years later, which he held for over four decades. The current editor is Bernhard Siegel. It is currently the longest-running in-house publication in the electronics industry.

Analog Dialogue is a forum for the exchange of circuits, systems, and software for real-world signal processing and is the technical magazine published by Analog Devices. It discusses products, applications, technology, and techniques for analog, digital, and mixed-signal processing. Analog Dialogue is published monthly on the Web. The featured technical articles are also compiled in quarterly print editions.

== Communities ==
=== Community ===
In 2009, Analog Devices announced EngineerZone, an online technical support community. EngineerZone was launched so the design engineering community (customers, prospects, partners, employees and students) can ask questions, share knowledge and search for answers to their questions in an open forum. EngineerZone currently hosts over 100 English forums to discuss ADI products and share projects with other engineers. Members are encouraged to self-serve by searching their rich knowledge base of FAQs and to respond to fellow member's threads. EZ China is also available for members seeking support in simplified Chinese.

=== Resources ===
Analog Devices offers reference circuits through its Circuits from the Lab program. These circuits are engineered and tested for quick system integration to help solve design challenges ranging from common to complex. Reference circuits are smaller, modular designs that are more broadly applicable than application-specific reference designs.

Each reference circuit is documented with test data, theory of operation, and component selection decision criteria. In addition, reference circuits are tailored to meet real-world system integration needs and may also include board layout schematics, CAD tools models, device drivers, and evaluation hardware.

== Acquisitions ==
- 1969: Pastoriza Electronics
- 1971: Nova Devices
- 1978: Computer Labs
- 1984: International Imaging Systems
- 1990: Precision Monolithics, Inc.
- 1991: Edsun Laboratories-Tech Assets
- 1996: Mosaic Microsystems Ltd.
- 1997: Medialight Inc.
- 1999: Edinburgh Portable Compilers | White Mountain DSP
- 2000: BCO Technologies PLC, Signal Processing Associates, Integrated Micro Instruments Inc., Chiplogic Inc. and Staccato Systems Inc.
- 2006: AudioAsics A/S, Integrant Technologies and TTPCom Ltd.-Certain Property
- 2011: Lyric Semiconductor, Inc.
- 2014: Hittite Microwave Corporation (HITT)
- 2016: Linear Technology, Sypris Electronics and Cyber Security Solutions Business
- 2018: Symeo GmbH
- 2019: Test Motors
- 2020: Maxim Integrated
- 2026: Empower Semiconductor
- 2026: Alif Semiconductor
