= TigerSHARC =

Family of microprocessors

- Designer: Analog Devices
- Bits: 32-bit
- Introduced: 2000; 25 years ago
- Design: DSP/RISC
- Type: Load–store
- Encoding: ?
- Branching: ?
- Endianness: ?

Registers
- 2 × 32 × 32-bit address registers
- General-purpose: 2 × 32 × 32-bit registers (addressable in 16-bit parts)

TigerSHARC refers to a family of microprocessors currently manufactured by Analog Devices Inc (ADI). It is superscalar and features data-parallelism in the form of short-vector SIMD and subword (16-bit) parallelism (SWAR). It consists of:

- Two separate computation blocks (CompBlocks) each with 32 general-purpose registers and their own ALU, multiplier, and shifter; 256-bit read and 128-bit write bus access
- Two integer ALUs (JALU, KALU) each with 32 registers; mainly intended for address generation, but is also capable of general integer arithmetic; 32-bit data bus
- A sequencer with 128-entry 4-way associative branch target buffer; 128-bit data bus
- Three separate internal memory banks (SRAM)
- External port with DMA

== See also ==
- SHARC
- Blackfin
