= Analog Dialogue =

Analog Dialogue is a technical magazine published by Analog Devices (ADI). It is a forum for the exchange of information related to circuits, systems, and software for real-world signal processing. It discusses products, applications, technology, and techniques for analog, digital, and mixed-signal processing, serving as a gateway to ADI’s technology. Analog Dialogue is published monthly on the Web, and featured technical articles are compiled in quarterly print editions. The headquarters of the magazine is in Norwood, Massachusetts. The current editor-in-chief is Bernhard Siegel.

== History ==
Published continually since 1967, Analog Dialogue is the longest-running in-house publication in the electronics industry. Its online version, published since 1999, includes articles written by design, applications, and marketing engineers at Analog Devices. Subject matter includes tutorials, technology, applications, and other information about products for analog, digital, and mixed-signal processing; information on new products, hyperlinked to data sheets and other information; and a potpourri section with links to other information, mostly on the ADI website.

The online archives provide access to every article beginning with Volume 1, Number 1, first published in 1967. The articles can be accessed by volume and by author.

On February 1, 2013, Dan Sheingold retired after 44 years as editor of Analog Dialogue. He took over the post in 1969. Replacing him was Scott Wayne who served as publisher and managing editor until 2015.

In October 2016, the magazine added a StudentZone section with resources aimed at engineering students.
