= Parallel Peripheral Interface =

Parallel port on Blackfin microprocessors

The Parallel Peripheral Interface (PPI) is a peripheral found on the Blackfin embedded processor. The PPI is a half-duplex, bi-directional port that is designed to connect directly to LCDs, CMOS sensors, CCDs, video encoders (video DACs), video decoders (video ADCs) or any generic high speed, parallel device.

The width of the PPI is programmable and can be set between 8 and 16 bits in 1-bit increments. The latest Blackfin family (BF54x) also features an 18/24-bit PPI for direct connection to RGB LCD panels.

The PPI can run from 0 MHz up to 66 MHz.

The PPI has a dedicated clock pin, three multiplexed frame sync pins, and between 16 and 24 data pins.
