= Analogic Corporation =

Imaging device manufacturer

- Type: Private
- Traded as: Formerly Nasdaq: ALOG
- Industry: Health Care (Medical Equipment & Devices)
- Founded: 1967; 59 years ago, in Wakefield, Massachusetts
- Headquarters: Salem, New Hampshire
- Products: Medical & Security Imaging Systems and Subsystems
- Revenue: $486 million (FY 2017)
- Owner: Altaris Capital Partners, LLC
- Number of employees: 1,500 (2008)
- Website: analogic.com

Analogic Corporation is an American multinational corporation specialized in healthcare technology and aviation security industries. Primarily producing CT scan, digital mammography and MRI equipments for health facilities, the company also develops baggage screening, checkpoint and motion control technologies for airports.

== History ==
Bernard M. Gordon founded Gordon Engineering in 1963. The company is later renamed to Analogic Corporation in 1967. While at Analogic, Gordon and his engineering team conceived and developed the first digital waveform analyzing and computing instrumentation; "instant imaging" Computed Tomography (CT) system; portable, mobile CT scanner; and the first three-dimensional, multi-slice, dual-energy explosive detection CT system, among many other pioneering products.

The company opened a manufacturing facility in Shanghai, China, in December 2009.

Analogic Corporation was acquired in 2018 by an affiliate of private equity firm Altaris Capital Partners.

== Company ==
As of April 2018, the company employs 1,500 employees worldwide with approximately 800 working at the main facility and headquarters in Peabody, Massachusetts.

Jim Green, who had been CEO for nine years, stepped down from his position in 2016. He was succeeded by Fred B. Parks. Tom Ripp is the current CEO.

Analogic was included in Electronic Design's list for the Top 50 Employers in Electronic Design in 2012. It was also selected by the Boston Globe as one of the top 100 companies in Massachusetts in 2013.

In 2026, Analogic moved its headquarters from Peabody, Mass. to Salem, New Hampshire.

== Acquisitions ==
Ultrasonix Medical Corporation

Ultrasonix Medical Corporation was a Vancouver, Canada-based sonography equipment company founded in 2000 which Analogic acquired in 2013 as a strategic expansion of its own ultrasound imaging product line and customer base, including an installed base of 5,000 systems globally. At the time of its acquisition, Ultrasonix had at least two manufacturing plants, in Englewood, Colorado and Vancouver, British Columbia, both of which were closed following the acquisition.

Copley Controls

In 2008, Analogic acquired Copley Controls, a Canton, Mass.-based supplier of gradient amplifiers for MRI Systems.

== Products ==
Analogic provides imaging systems and technology that enable computed tomography (CT), digital mammography, and magnetic resonance imaging (MRI). The company's CT, MRI, and digital mammography products are sold to original equipment manufacturers (OEMs).
