= Bernard Marshall Gordon =

American inventor

Bernard Marshall Gordon (born 1927 in Springfield, Massachusetts) is an American engineer, inventor, entrepreneur, and philanthropist. He is considered "the father of high-speed analog-to-digital conversion".

== Early life, education, and career ==
At an early age Gordon developed an interest in electronics. Upon graduation from Springfield's Technical High School, he enlisted in the US Navy and later became a commissioned officer. He earned BS and MA degrees in Electrical Engineering at the Massachusetts Institute of Technology via the V-12 program and the GI Bill.

In 1947, Gordon began his technical career at Philco Corporation and later joined the Eckert-Mauchly Computer Corporation, where he was responsible for the development of the standard circuits, acoustic memory, supervisory control, and input/output circuits of the first commercial computer, UNIVAC I.

He subsequently worked at the Laboratory for Electronics (LFE), a spinoff of the wartime Radiation Laboratory at MIT. While there, Gordon helped create the first current switching digital-to-analog converter in 1951 as part of the first digital pulse position indicators for radar.

== A/D conversion ==
From the late 1930s into the early 1950s, digital signal processing was an attractive idea. However, progress was limited and then state-of-the-art systems were slow, offering limited precision, and were only a modest improvement over purely manual methods.

In 1953, Gordon and Joseph H. Davis co-founded EPSCO, Inc. to manufacture a variety of electronic components and subassemblies. While at EPSCO, in 1953–54, Gordon created high-precision and high-speed signal processing, including the core technologies of analog-to-digital conversion. These developments were fundamental to the subsequent medical diagnostic tools, and have influenced therapeutic practice as well. Gordon publicized these developments in his paper, "A high-speed AD converter and its possible applications", delivered to the 1955 conference of the Instrument Society of America.

Building on this work, Gordon and his engineering teams developed the first solid-state x-ray generator, the first quadrature-base band phased-array ultrasound system, and the first instant imaging computer-aided tomography system, among many other related inventions. These developments enabled subsequent advances in fields as diverse as aerospace telemetry, industrial control, communications, and many modern consumer products which rely on the digitization of analog measurement, audio, video, and optical inputs.

EPSCO grew rapidly for several years. Gordon later left the company and in 1963, founded Gordon Engineering. In 1967, Gordon Engineering became Analogic Corporation and at various times Gordon served as chairman of the board of directors, president, executive chairman, and chief executive officer. While at Analogic, he and the teams of engineers he led conceived and developed the first digital waveform analyzing and computing instrumentation; "instant imaging" Computed Tomography (CT) system; portable, mobile CT scanner; and the first three-dimensional, multi-slice, dual-energy explosive detection CT system, among many other pioneering products.

In 2004, after leaving the active management of Analogic, he co-founded NeuroLogica Corporation of Danvers, Massachusetts, where he served as chairman of the board. Its first project was a portable imaging system, for neurological scanning applications, which could assist stroke and trauma victims. The company was acquired by Samsung Electronics in 2013. He retired from Analogic's board of directors in 2009.

In 2009, he co-founded Photo Diagnostic Systems, Inc with Olof Johnson. That company that went on to design and manufacture imaging products in medicine, veterinary medicine, and aviation security. Its first product was the first commercial solid-state PET/CT the NeuroPET-CT for brain imaging. PDSI later developed a security imager that was integrated into the DETECT1000 product by Integrated Defense and Security Solutions, a vertical CT for imaging of horses, the Equina for Asto CT as well as other products.

== Involvement with education ==
Over the course of his career, Gordon has frequently advocated for more thorough training of engineers and, in particular, for encouraging greater leadership capabilities in engineers. To that end, In 1984 he established the Gordon Institute, a graduate-level program for career engineers located in Wakefield, Massachusetts. In 1992, Gordon allied his Gordon Institute with the Tufts University College of Engineering in nearby Medford, Massachusetts.

In 2002, he established The Gordon Center for systems engineering as part of the Technion Israel Institute of Technology. Its post-graduate program (Master of Engineering in Systems Engineering) has produced hundreds of graduates.

In 2007, Gordon provided a $20 million gift (with a matching requirement) to establish the Gordon-MIT Engineering Leadership (GEL) Program, in part to create a national model for preparing the engineering leaders of the 21st century. Immediately following its inception, the program began gathering input from industrial and academic sources to inform creation of the program and curriculum. GEL's foundational document, the Capabilities of Effective Engineering Leaders, was a result.

In 2009, Gordon established the Gordon Institute for Engineering Leadership at Northeastern University through a $40 million grant. The institute's mission is to identify candidates to pursue engineering leadership skills as part of a Master of Science degree in a range of engineering disciplines, or as a standalone Certificate in Engineering Leadership.

Gordon has been both influential and supportive of a number of other engineering programs in the US.

== Bernard M. Gordon Prize for Innovation in Engineering and Technology Education ==
Inaugurated in 2001 by the National Academy of Engineering (NAE), the intent of the Gordon Prize is to recognize new modalities and experiments in education that develop effective engineering leaders. The focus is on innovations such as curricular design, teaching methods, and technology-enabled learning that strengthen students' capabilities and desire to grow into leadership roles.

The Gordon Prize is presented annually, and the recipient receives a $500,000 cash award, half granted to the recipient and the remainder granted to the recipient's institution to support the continued development, refinement, and dissemination of the recognized innovation. NAE members and non-members who are US citizens or permanent residents of the US, and who currently are and have been substantially engaged in their engineering and scholastic work in institutions within the US are eligible for the Gordon Prize.

== Other philanthropy ==
Gordon and his wife, Sofia, also provided substantial funding to Brigham and Women's Hospital, Boston; Lahey Clinic (now Lahey Hospital and Medical Center), Burlington, Massachusetts, Salem State University, Salem, Massachusetts, and the Boston Museum of Science.

== Awards and honors ==
- 1971 – Outstanding Living Engineer Award from the Engineering Societies of New England.
- 1972 – Elected an Institute of Electrical and Electronics Engineers Fellow
- 1985 – Received an Honorary Doctorate from Salem State University in Salem, MA.
- 1986 – Received the National Medal of Technology from President Ronald Reagan.
- 1991 – Elected to the National Academy of Engineering.
- 1992 – Received the Benjamin Franklin Award for Innovation in Engineering and Technology from the Franklin Institute.

== Publications ==
- Gordon, Bernard (14 October 1981). "Education for electronics leadership". EDN. UBM Canon. ISSN 0012-7515.
- Gordon, Bernard M. (28 August 1984). "Keynote Presentation: What Is an Engineer?" (PDF). European Society for Engineering Education - Annual Conference. University of Erlangen-Nuremberg. Archived from the original (PDF) on 2015-09-24.
- Gordon, Bernard M. (Editor, 2012) "Toward a New Engineering Education Consensus: Ideas from Industry and Academia for Inculcating and Fostering Leadership Skills," Published under the auspices of the Gordon Foundation, Danvers, Massachusetts, 2012

== Patents (partial listing) ==
- U.S. Patent 7,664,543, Gordon, Bernard M.; "CT scanner for and method of imaging a preselected portion of the lower abdomen region of a patient", published 16 February 2010
- U.S. Patent 7,431,500, Gordon, Bernard M. & Deych, Ruvin; "Dynamic exposure control in radiography", published 7 October 2008
- US 6252531, Gordon, Bernard M.; Weedon, Hans & Poulo, Louis R. et al., "Data acquisition system using delta-sigma analog-to-digital signal converters", published 26 June 2001
- US 6256404, Christopher C. Ruth, Carl R. Crawford, Bernard M.; Bailey, Eric M. & Schafer, David A., "Computed tomography scanning apparatus and method using adaptive reconstruction window", published 2 July 2001
- US 6657571, Gordon, Bernard M.; Weedon, Hans & Poulo, Louis R. et al., "Data acquisition system using delta-sigma analog-to-digital signal converters", published 2 December 2003
- U.S. patent 6,188,745 CT scanner comprising a spatially encoded detector array arrangement and method
- U.S. patent 6,067,342 Digital filmless X-ray projection imaging system and method
- U.S. patent RE36099 X-ray tomography apparatus
- U.S. patent 5,867,553 Computed tomography scanner with reduced power x-ray source
- U.S. patent 5,841,828 Self-calibrating ring suppression filter for use in computed tomography systems
- U.S. patent 5,818,897 Quadrature transverse CT detection system
- U.S. patent 5,808,376 Method of and apparatus for power management and distribution in a medical imaging system
- U.S. patent 5,796,802 Multiple angle pre-screening tomographic systems and methods
- U.S. patent 5,768,331 X-ray tomography system for and method of improving the quality of a scanned image
- U.S. patent 5,745,542 Ring suppression filter for use in computed tomography systems
- U.S. patent 5,661,774 Dual energy power supply
- U.S. patent 5,577,026 Apparatus for transferring data to and from a moving device
- U.S. patent 5,432,339 Apparatus for and method of measuring geometric, positional and kinematic parameters of a rotating device having a plurality of interval markers
- U.S. patent RE34379 X-ray tomography apparatus
- U.S. patent 5,109,397 X-ray tomography apparatus with lateral movement compensation
- U.S. patent 4,928,283 X-ray tomography apparatus
- U.S. patent 4,801,851 Oscilloscope memory control
- U.S. patent 4,758,963 Modular computing oscilloscope with high speed signal memory
- U.S. patent 4,677,554 Tomography data acquisition system with variable sampling rate and/or conversion resolution of detector output signals
- U.S. patent 4,569,028 Adaptive digitizer circuit for information processing system
- U.S. patent 4,547,893 Continuous wave fan beam tomography system having a best-estimating filter
- U.S. patent 4,350,974 Logarithmic analog-to-digital converter
- U.S. patent 4,152,659 Low noise differential amplifier
- U.S. patent 4,142,185 Logarithmic analog-to-digital converter
- U.S. patent 4,135,247 Tomography signal processing system
- U.S. patent 4,008,405 Motion detection circuit for electronic weighing system
- U.S. patent 4,002,964 Temperature compensation technique
