= List of compilers =

This page lists notable software that can be classified as a compiler, a compiler generator, an interpreter, translator, a tool foundation, an assembler, an automatable command line interface (shell), or similar.

== Ada compilers ==
Compiler	Author	Windows	Unix-like	Other OSs	License type
GCC (GNAT)	Ada Core Technologies	Yes	Yes	Yes	GPLv3+
Green Hills Ada	Green Hills Software	Yes	Yes	INTEGRITY, embedded targets	Proprietary
Ada Magic	Intermetrics	Yes	Yes	IBM MVS, CMS	Proprietary
Janus Ada	Randy Brukardt	Yes	No	CP/M, MS-DOS	Proprietary
Tandem Ada	Tandem Computers	No	Yes	Guardian, NonStop Kernel	Proprietary
Turbo Ada	Justin Squirek	Yes	Yes	Yes	GPLv2

== ALGOL 60 compilers ==
Compiler	Author	Windows	Unix-like	Other OSs	License type
ALGOL 60	RHA (Minisystems) Ltd	No	No	DOS, CP/M	Free for personal use
Persistent S-algol	Paul Cockshott	Yes	No	DOS	Copyright only
MCP	Burroughs	No	No	MCP	Proprietary

== ALGOL 68 compilers ==
cf. ALGOL 68s specification and implementation timeline

Name	Year	Purpose	State	Description	Target CPU	Licensing	Implementation Language
ALGOL 68-R^{R}	1970	Military	UK		ICL 1900		ALGOL 60
ALGOL 68RS^{RS}	1972	Military	UK	Portable compiler system	ICL 2900/Series 39, Multics, VMS & C generator (1993)	Crown Copyright	ALGOL 68RS
ALGOL 68C^{C}	1975	Scientific	UK	Cambridge ALGOL 68	ICL, IBM 360, PDP 10 & Unix, Telefunken, Tesla & Z80(1980)	Cambridge	ALGOL 68C
Odra ALGOL 68	1976	practical uses	USSR/Poland		Odra 1204/IL	Soviet	ALGOL 60
FLACC^{F}	1977	Multi-purpose	CA	Revised Report complete implementation with debug features	System/370	lease, Chion Corporation	Assembler
Interactive ALGOL 68^{I}	1983		UK	Incremental compilation	PC	Noncommercial shareware	
ALGOL 68S^{S}	1985	Scientific	Intl	Sun version of ALGOL 68	Sun-3, Sun SPARC (under SunOS 4.1 & Solaris 2), Atari ST (under GEMDOS), Acorn Archimedes (under RISC OS), VAX-11 under Ultrix-32		
Algol68toC (ctrans)	1985	Electronics	UK	ctrans from ELLA ALGOL 68RS	Portable C generator	Open sourced & Public Domained (1995)	ALGOL 68RS
GCC (ga68)	2025	Full Language	ES	GCC Front-End	Portable compiler	GPL	C

== Assemblers (Intel *86) ==
Assembler	Author	Windows	Unix-like	Other OSs	License type
A86 assembler	Eric Isaacson	Yes	No	No	Proprietary
FASM	Tomasz Grysztar	Yes	Yes	Yes	BSD
GNU Assembler	The GNU Project	Yes	Yes	Yes	GPLv3
High Level Assembly (HLA)	Randall Hyde	Yes	Yes	Yes	Public domain
JWasm Assembler	Japheth and others	Yes	Yes	Yes	Sybase Open Watcom Public License
Microsoft Macro Assembler	Microsoft	Yes	No	No	Proprietary
Netwide Assembler	Simon Tatham and Julian Hall	Yes	Yes	Yes	BSD
Turbo Assembler	Borland	Yes	No	No	Proprietary

== Assemblers (Motorola 68*) ==
Assembler	Author	Windows	Unix-like	Other OSs	License type
GNU Assembler	The GNU Project	Yes	Yes	Yes	GPLv3

== Assemblers (Zilog Z80) ==
Assembler	Author	Windows	Unix-like	Other OSs	License type
Microsoft MACRO-80	Microsoft	No	No	Yes	Proprietary
Zeus Assembler	Neil Mottershead, Simon Brattel	No	No	Yes	Proprietary
Prometheus	Proxima software	No	No	No	Proprietary

== Assemblers (other) ==
Assembler	Author	Windows	Unix-like	Other OSs	License type
TI-990 assembler	Texas Instruments	Yes	Yes	Yes	Proprietary
GNU Assembler	The GNU Project	Yes	Yes	Yes	GPLv3

== BASIC compilers ==
Compiler	Author	Working state	Windows	Unix-like	Other OSs	License type	Standard conformance	
Compiler	Author	Working state	Windows	Unix-like	Other OSs	License type	Minimal BASIC	Full BASIC
AppGameKit	The Game Creators	Current	Yes	Yes	No	Proprietary	?	?
BBC BASIC for SDL 2.0	Richard T. Russell	Current	Yes	Yes (Linux, macOS, Android)	Yes (Raspberry Pi OS)	zlib License	No	No
BlitzMax	Blitz Research	Discontinued	Yes	Yes (Linux, macOS)	No	zlib License	No	No
DarkBASIC	The Game Creators	Inactive	Yes	No	No	MIT License	No	No
ECMA-55 Minimal BASIC compiler	John Gatewood Ham	Current	No	Linux	No	GPLv2	Yes	No
FreeBASIC	FreeBASIC Development Team	Current	Yes	Yes	MS-DOS, FreeBSD, Linux	GPLv2+	Partial	No
FutureBASIC	Brilor Software	Current	No	macOS	Classic Mac OS	Proprietary	Partial	No
Gambas	Benoît Minisini	Current	No	Yes	No	GPLv2+	No	No
GFA BASIC	Frank Ostrowski	Abandoned	Yes	No	Amiga, Atari ST, MS-DOS	Proprietary	No	No
Mercury	RemObjects	Current	Yes	Yes (Linux, macOS, Android, iOS)	Yes (WebAssembly)	Proprietary	No	No
PowerBASIC (formerly Turbo Basic)	PowerBASIC, Inc.	Inactive	Yes	No	DOS	Proprietary	?	?
PureBasic	Fantaisie Software	Current	Yes	Yes	Yes	Proprietary	No	No
QB64	Galleon	Current	Yes	Yes	Yes	LGPLv2.1	Partial	No
QuickBASIC	Microsoft	Discontinued	No	No	MS-DOS	Proprietary	Partial	No
Tandem Basic	Tandem Computers	Inactive	No	No	Guardian, NonStop Kernel, NonStop OS	Proprietary	Yes	?
True BASIC	True BASIC	Current	Yes	No	No	Proprietary	Yes	Partial
VSI BASIC for OpenVMS	VMS Software, Inc.	Current	No	No	OpenVMS	Proprietary	No	No
Xojo (formerly REALbasic)	Xojo Inc. (formerly Real Software)	Current	Yes	Yes	Yes	Proprietary	No	No

== BASIC interpreters ==
Interpreter	Author	Windows	Unix-like	Other OSs	License type
BASIC-PLUS	Digital Equipment Corporation	No	No	RSTS/E	Proprietary
BBC BASIC for SDL 2.0	Richard T. Russell	Yes	Yes (Linux, macOS, Android, iOS)	Raspberry Pi OS, Web browser	zlib License
Liberty BASIC	Shoptalk Systems	Yes	No	No	Proprietary
GW-BASIC	Microsoft	No	No	MS-DOS	Proprietary
QBasic	Microsoft	No	No	MS-DOS	Proprietary
Chipmunk Basic	Ronald H. Nicholson Jr.	Yes	Yes	Yes	Freeware
TI BASIC (TI 99/4A)	Texas Instruments	No	No	TI-99/4A	Proprietary
TI Extended BASIC	Texas Instruments	No	No	TI-99/4A	Proprietary
Rocky Mountain BASIC	[Trans Era]	Yes	No	HP 9000	Proprietary
Yabasic	Marc-Oliver Ihm	Yes	Yes	Haiku	MIT License
SmallBASIC	SmallBASIC	Yes	Yes	Android, macOS	GPLv3+
SuperBASIC	Jan Jones	No	No	Sinclair QL	Proprietary
Level I BASIC	Steve Leininger	No	No	TRS-80 ROM	Proprietary
Level II BASIC	Microsoft	No	No	TRSDOS, NewDos/80, MultiDOS, DosPlus, LDOS	Proprietary
Level III BASIC	Microsoft	No	No	TRSDOS, NewDos/80, MultiDOS, DosPlus, LDOS	Proprietary
VAX BASIC	Digital Equipment Corporation	No	No	VAX/VMS	Proprietary

== C compilers ==
Compiler	Author	Operating system (Note: List of host operating systems and/or ⟨cross-compilation targets⟩.)			Bare machine	License type	Standard conformance			
Compiler	Author	Microsoft Windows	Unix-like	Other OSs	Bare machine	License type	C89	C99	C11	C17
8cc	Rui Ueyama	Yes	Yes	?	?	MIT	Yes	Yes	Yes	No
Acorn C/C++	Acorn and Codemist	No	No	RISC OS	?	Proprietary	Yes	Yes	No	Yes
AMD Optimizing C/C++ Compiler (AOCC)	AMD	No	Yes	No	?	Proprietary	Yes	Yes	Yes	Yes
Aztec C	Manx Software Systems	No	No	CP/M, CP/M-86, DOS, Classic Mac OS	?	Proprietary	?	?	?	?
Amsterdam Compiler Kit	Andrew Tanenbaum and Ceriel Jacobs	No	Yes	Yes	?	BSD	?	?	?	?
BDS C	BD Software	No	No	CP/M	?	Public domain	?	?	?	?
bcc (Bruce's C Compiler)	Bruce Evans	No	Yes	No	?	GNU License	?	?	?	?
C++Builder	Embarcadero	Yes	Yes (iOS, Android)	No	?	Proprietary	Yes	Yes	Partial	?
cc65		No	Yes	No	Yes	Zlib License	No	No	No	No
Ch	SoftIntegration, Inc	Yes	macOS, FreeBSD, Linux, Solaris, HP-UX, AIX, QNX	Yes	?	Freeware	Yes	Yes	No	?
Clang	LLVM Project	Yes	Yes	Yes	Yes	Apache (LLVM Exception)	Yes	Yes	Yes	Yes
CompCert	INRIA	Yes	Yes	No	?	Freeware (source code available for non-commercial use) or GPL	Yes	Partial	No	?
cproc	Michael Forney	Yes	Yes	No	?	ISC	Yes	Yes	Yes	Yes
Digital Mars	Digital Mars	Yes	No	No	?	Proprietary	?	?	?	?
Digital Research C	Digital Research	?	?	CP/M, DOS	?	Proprietary	?	?	?	?
Edison Design Group	Edison Design Group	Yes	Yes	Yes	?	Proprietary	Yes	Yes	Yes	Yes
GCC (gcc)	GNU Project	MinGW, Cygwin, WSL	Yes	IBM mainframe, AmigaOS, VMS, RTEMS, DOS	Yes	GPL	Yes	Partial (Note: Complete except for floating point.)	Partial	Partial
Intel oneAPI DPC++/C++ Compiler (icx)	Intel	Yes	Linux	No	?	Freeware (optional priority support)	Yes	Yes	Yes	Yes
Intel C++ Compiler Classic (icc)	Intel	Yes	Linux, macOS	No	?	Freeware (optional priority support)	Yes	Partial	Partial	?
Interactive C	KISS Institute for Practical Robotics	Yes	Unix, macOS, Linux, IRIX, Solaris, SunOS	No	?	Freeware	Partial	No	No	?
Lattice C	Lifeboat Associates	No	Yes	DOS, OS/2, Commodore, Amiga, Atari ST, Sinclair QL	?	Proprietary	?	?	?	?
lcc	Chris Fraser and David Hanson	Yes	Yes	Yes	?	Freeware (source code available for non-commercial use)	Yes	No	No	?
MCP	Unisys	No	No	MCP	?	Proprietary	?	?	?	?
MPW C	Apple	No	No	Classic Mac OS	?	Proprietary	?	?	?	?
Open64	AMD, SGI, Google, HP, Intel, Nvidia, PathScale, Tsinghua University and others	No	Yes	Yes	?	GPL	?	?	?	?
PGCC	The Portland Group	Yes	Yes	Unknown	?	Proprietary	?	?	?	?
Portable C Compiler	Stephen C. Johnson, Anders Magnusson and others	Yes	Yes	Yes	?	BSD	Yes	Partial	No	?
QuickC	Microsoft	Yes	No	No	?	Proprietary	?	?	?	?
Alan Snyder's Portable C Compiler	Alan Snyder and current Maintainer larsbrinkhoff|Snyder-C-compiler	No	Yes	No	?	MIT License	?	?	?	?
SEGGER Compiler	Segger Microcontroller	Yes	Yes	Yes	?	Proprietary	Yes	Yes	Partial	Partial
Small-C	Ron Caine, James E. Hendrix, Byte magazine	Yes	Yes	CP/M, DOS	?	Public domain	Partial	No	No	?
Small Device C Compiler	Sandeep Dutta and others	Yes	Yes	Unknown	Yes	GPL	?	?	?	?
Tandem C	Tandem Computers	No	Yes	Guardian, NonStop Kernel, NonStop OS	?	Proprietary	Yes	?	?	Partial
THINK C, Lightspeed C	THINK Technologies	No	No	Classic Mac OS	?	Proprietary	?	?	?	?
Tiny C Compiler	Fabrice Bellard	Yes	Yes	No	?	LGPL	Yes	Partial	Partial	?
(Borland) Turbo C	Embarcadero	Yes	No	Yes	?	Proprietary - V 2.01 freely available	?	?	?	?
VBCC	Volker Barthelmann	Yes	Yes	Yes	?	Freeware (source code available, modification not allowed)	Yes	Partial	No	?
Microsoft Visual C++	Microsoft	Yes	No	No	?	Proprietary (Freeware)	Yes	Partial	Yes	Yes
Oracle C compiler	Oracle	No	Solaris, Linux	No	?	Proprietary (Freeware)	Yes	Yes	Yes	No
Watcom C/C++, Open Watcom C/C++	Watcom	Yes	experimental	DOS, OS/2	?	Sybase Open Watcom Public License	Yes	Partial	No	?
Wind River (Diab) Compiler	Wind River Systems	Yes	Yes	Yes	?	Proprietary	?	?	?	?
Whitesmiths C compiler	Whitesmiths Ltd	No	Yes	No	?	proprietary (source code available for non-commercial use)	No	?	No	?
XL C, XL C/C++	IBM	No	AIX, Linux	z/OS, z/VM	?	Proprietary	Yes	Yes	Yes	Yes

== C++ compilers ==
Compiler	Author	Operating system (Note: List of host operating systems and/or ⟨cross-compilation targets⟩.)			License type	IDE	Standard conformance				
Compiler	Author	Windows	Unix-like	Other	License type	IDE	C++11	C++14	C++17	C++20	C++23
AMD Optimizing C/C++ Compiler (AOCC)	AMD	No	Yes	No	Proprietary (Freeware)	No	Yes	Yes	Yes	Partial	Partial
C++Builder (classic Borland, bcc*)	Embarcadero (CodeGear)	Yes (bcc32)	macOS (bccosx)	No	Proprietary (Free Community Edition)	Yes	Yes	No	No	?	?
C++Builder (modern, bcc*c)	Embarcadero (LLVM)	Yes (bcc32c,bcc64, bcc32x,bcc64x)	⟨iOS⟩ (bccios*), ⟨Android⟩ (bcca*)	No	Proprietary (Freeware - 32bit CLI, Free Limited Commercial Edition)	Yes	Yes (Note: Uses a Clang Front End.)	Yes	Yes	?	?
Turbo C++ (tcc)	Borland (CodeGear)	Yes	No	DOS	Proprietary Freeware	Yes	No	No	No	?	?
CINT	CERN	Yes	Yes	BeBox, DOS, etc.	X11/MIT	Yes	No	No	No	?	?
Cfront	Bjarne Stroustrup	No	Yes	No	?	No	No	No	No	?	?
Clang (clang++)	LLVM Project	Yes	Yes	Yes	UoI/NCSA	Xcode, QtCreator (optional)	Yes	Yes	Yes	Partial	Partial
Comeau C/C++	Comeau Computing	Yes	Yes	Yes	Proprietary	No	No (Note: Uses an EDG Front End.)	No	No	?	?
Cray C/C++ (CC)	Cray	No	No	No	Proprietary	No	Yes (Note: The Cray C++ Libraries do not support wide characters and only support a single locale.)	Yes	Yes	Partial	No
Digital Mars C/C++ (dmc)	Digital Mars	Yes	No	DOS	Boost	No	Partial	No	No	?	?
EDG C++ Front End (eccp, edgcpfe)	Edison Design Group	Yes	Yes	Yes	Proprietary	No	Yes	Yes	Yes	Partial	Partial
EKOPath (pathCC)	PathScale and others	No	Yes	Yes	GPL	No	Yes (Note: Uses a GCC Front End.)	Partial	No	?	?
GCC (g++)	GNU Project	MinGW, MSYS2, Cygwin, Windows Subsystem	Yes	Yes	GPLv3	QtCreator, Kdevelop, Eclipse, NetBeans, Code::Blocks, Dev-C++, Geany	Yes	Yes	Yes	Partial	Partial
HP aC++ (aCC)	Hewlett-Packard	No	HP-UX	No	Proprietary	No	Partial	No	No	?	?
IAR C/C++ Compilers (icc*)	IAR Systems	Yes	No	⟨Yes⟩	Proprietary	IAR Embedded Workbench	Yes	Yes	Partial	?	?
Intel C++ Compiler (icc)	Intel	Yes	Linux, macOS, FreeBSD; ⟨Android (x86-64)⟩	No	Proprietary (Freeware)	Visual Studio, Eclipse, Xcode	Yes	Yes	Yes	Partial	Partial
KAI C++ (KCC)	Kuck & Associates, Inc. ⟨subsumed by Intel⟩	No	TOPS-20, Digital Unix, HP-UX, Linux (x86), IRIX 5.3 & 6.x, Solaris 2.x, UNICOS	No	Proprietary	No	No	No	No	?	?
Microtec C/C++ (mcc)	Mentor ⟨Siemens⟩	Yes	Yes	Yes	Proprietary	EDGE Developer Suite	No	No	No	?	?
EDGE C/C++ (Note: The EDGE C/C++ compiler is based on the Microtec C/C++ compiler.)	Mentor ⟨Siemens⟩	Yes	Yes	Yes	Proprietary	EDGE Developer Suite	No	No	No	?	
Open64 (openCC)	HP, AMD, Tsinghua University and others	No	Yes	No	Modified GPLv2	No	No (Note: Last Open64 v5.0 uses GCC 4.2 as its Front End, which doesn't support any C++11.)	No	No	?	?
PGC++ (pgc++)	PGI ⟨Nvidia⟩	Unsupported	Linux, macOS	No	Proprietary	Eclipse, Xcode, Visual Studio	Yes	Yes	Partial	?	?
ProDev WorkShop	Silicon Graphics	No	IRIX 5.3 & 6.x	Yes	Proprietary	Yes	?	?	?	?	?
RealView Compilation Tools (armcc)	Keil ⟨Arm⟩	Yes	Yes	⟨Yes⟩	Proprietary	RealView Development Suite	No	No	No	?	?
Arm Compiler (armcc)	Keil ⟨Arm⟩	Yes	Yes	⟨Yes⟩	Proprietary	μVision, DS-5	Yes	No	No	?	?
Arm Compiler (armclang)	Keil ⟨Arm⟩ (LLVM)	Yes	No	⟨Yes⟩	Proprietary	μVision, DS-5	Yes	Yes	No	?	?
Salford C++ Compiler	Silverfrost	Yes	No	No	Proprietary	Yes	?	?	?	?	?
SAS/C C++	SAS Institute	Windows NT/95	AIX, Solaris/SunOS, Linux	IBM mainframe, DOS	Proprietary	No	?	?	?	?	?
SCORE C++ (tpp)	DDC-I	Yes	Yes	Yes	Proprietary	Yes	Yes	No	No	?	?
SEGGER Compiler	Segger Microcontroller	Yes	Yes	Yes	Proprietary	Yes	Yes	Partial	Partial	?	?
Oracle C++ Compiler (CC)	Oracle	No	Linux, Solaris	No	Proprietary (Freeware)	Oracle Developer Studio, NetBeans	Yes	Yes	No	?	?
Tandem C++	Tandem Computers	No	Yes	NonStop Kernel, NonStop OS	Proprietary	Eclipse	?	No	No	?	
TenDRA (tcc)	TenDRA Project	No	Yes	No	BSD	No	No	No	No	?	?
VectorC	Codeplay	Yes	No	⟨PS2⟩, ⟨PS3⟩, etc.	Proprietary	Visual Studio, CodeWarrior	Partial	No	No	?	?
Visual C++ (cl)	Microsoft	Yes	Linux, macOS; ⟨Android⟩, ⟨iOS⟩	DOS	Proprietary (Free for Individuals and Enterprise under $1M Profit Cap)	Visual Studio, QtCreator	Yes	Yes	Yes	Yes	Partial
XL C/C++ (xlc++)	IBM	No	Linux (Power), AIX	z/OS, z/VM	Proprietary	Eclipse	Yes	Yes	Yes	Experimental for AIX	No
Diab Compiler (dcc)	Wind River ⟨TPG Capital⟩	Yes	Linux, Solaris	⟨VxWorks⟩	Proprietary	Wind River Workbench	No	No	No	?	?

== C# compilers ==
Compiler	Author	Type	Windows	Unix-like	Other OSs	License type	IDE?
Visual C#	Microsoft	JIT	Yes	iOS	No	Proprietary	Yes
Visual C# Express	Microsoft	JIT	Yes	No	No	Freeware	Yes
Mono	Xamarin	JIT	Yes	Yes	Yes	GPLv2	Yes
Portable.NET	DotGNU	AOT	Yes	Yes	No	GPL	No
SharpDevelop	IC#Code Team.	JIT	Yes	No	No	LGPL	Yes
Roslyn	.NET Foundation	JIT/AOT	Yes	Partial	No	Apache 2.0	No
RemObjects C#	RemObjects	AOT	Yes	Yes (Linux, macOS, Android, iOS)	Yes (WebAssembly)	Proprietary	Yes
IL2CPP	Unity Technologies	AOT	Yes	Yes	Yes	Proprietary	No
IL2CPU	COSMOS	AOT	Yes	Yes	Yes	BSD licenses	No
Bartok	Microsoft Research	AOT	Yes	No	No	Proprietary	No
RyuJIT	.NET Foundation.	JIT	Yes	Yes	Yes	MIT License	Yes
CoreRT	.NET Foundation.	AOT/JIT	Yes	Yes	Yes	MIT License	Yes

== COBOL compilers ==
Compiler	Author	Operating system			License type	IDE?	Standard conformance	
Compiler	Author	Windows	Unix-like	Other	License type	IDE?	COBOL-85	COBOL 2002
IBM COBOL	IBM	Yes	AIX, Linux	z/OS, z/VM, z/VSE, IBM i	Proprietary	IBM Developer for z/OS	Yes	Partial
GnuCOBOL (formerly OpenCOBOL)	Keisuke Nishida, Roger While, Simon Sobisch	Yes	Yes	Yes	GPL	OpenCobolIDE, GIX, HackEdit	Yes	Partial
GCC (gcobol)	COBOLworx (Symas)	Yes	Yes	Yes	GPL	No	Yes	Planned
Otterkit	Gabriel Gonçalves	Yes	Yes	Yes (Common Language Infrastructure)	Apache 2.0	Yes	Partial	Release candidate
MCP COBOL	Unisys	No	No	MCP	Proprietary	CANDE	Yes	No
OS 2200 COBOL	Unisys	No	No	OS 2200	Proprietary	?	Yes	No
Screen COBOL	Tandem Computers	No	No	Guardian, NonStop Kernel, NonStop OS	Proprietary	?	Yes	Partial
Tandem COBOL	Tandem Computers	No	No	Guardian, NonStop Kernel, NonStop OS	Proprietary	Eclipse, Micro Focus COBOL Workbench	?	?

== Common Lisp compilers ==
Compiler	Author	Target	Windows	Unix-like	Other OSs	License type	IDE?
Allegro Common Lisp	Franz, Inc.	Native code	Yes	Yes	Yes	Proprietary	Yes
Armed Bear Common Lisp	Peter Graves	JVM	Yes	Yes	Yes	GPL	Yes
CLISP	GNU Project	Bytecode	Yes	Yes	Yes	GPL	No
Clozure CL	Clozure Associates	Native code	Yes	Yes	No	LGPL	Yes
CMU Common Lisp	Carnegie Mellon University	Native code, Bytecode	No	Yes	No	Public domain	Yes
Corman Common Lisp	Corman Technologies	Native code	Yes	No	No	MIT license	Yes
Embeddable Common Lisp	Juanjo Garcia-Ripoll	Bytecode, C	Yes	Yes	Yes	LGPL	Yes
GNU Common Lisp	GNU Project	C	Yes	Yes	No	GPL	No
LispWorks	LispWorks Ltd	Native code	Yes	Yes	No	Proprietary	Yes
mocl	Wukix	Native code	No	Yes	Yes	Proprietary	No
Open Genera	Symbolics	Ivory emulator, own OS	No	No	Yes	Proprietary	Yes
Steel Bank Common Lisp	sbcl.org	Native code	Yes	Yes	Yes	Public domain	Yes

== D compilers ==
Compiler	Author	Windows	Unix-like	Other OSs	License type	IDE?
D (DMD)	Digital Mars and others	Yes	32-bit Linux, macOS, FreeBSD	No	Boost	No
D for .NET	?	Yes	Yes	?	?	?
GCC (GDC)	GNU Project	Yes	Yes	No	GPL	No
LDC	LLVM	Yes	Yes	No	multiple Open Source license depending on module	No

== DIBOL/DBL compilers ==
Compiler	Author	Windows	Unix-like	Other OSs	License type	IDE?
DIBOL	Digital Equipment Corporation	No	Yes	RSX-11, RT-11, RSTS/E, VAX/VMS, Open VMS	Proprietary	?
Synergy DBL	Synergex	Yes	Yes	Yes	Proprietary	Yes

== Eiffel compilers ==
Compiler	Author	Windows	Unix-like	Other OSs	License type	IDE?
EiffelStudio	Eiffel Software / Community developed (SourceForge)	Yes	Yes	Yes	GPL	Yes
LibertyEiffel (fork of SmartEiffel)	D. Colnet and community	?	Yes	?	GPLv2	?
SmartEiffel	D. Colnet	?	Yes	?	GPLv2	?

== Forth compilers and interpreters ==
Compiler	Author	Windows	Unix-like	Other OSs	License type
SwiftForth	Forth Inc.	Yes	Yes	No	Proprietary
Retro Forth	Charles Childers	Yes	Yes	?	ISC license
pForth	Phil Burk	Yes	Yes	Yes	public domain
Open Firmware	?	?	?	?	BSD license
Gforth	Bernd Paysan and Anton Ertl	Yes	Yes	No	GPL3
colorForth	Charles H. Moore	?	?	?	public domain
ciforth	Albert van der Horst	Yes	Yes	No	GPL
Atlast	John Walker	?	Yes	No	public domain
ByteForth	?	?	?	?	?
noForth	?	?	?	RISC-V baremetal	?

== Fortran compilers ==
Compiler	Author	Working state	Operating system			License type	IDE?
Compiler	Author	Working state	Windows	Unix-like	Other	License type	IDE?
Acorn Fortran 77	Acorn and Codemist	Current	No	No	RISC OS	Proprietary	No
AMD Optimizing C/C++ Compiler (AOCC)	AMD	Current	No	Yes	No	Freeware	No
Oracle Fortran	Oracle	Discontinued	No	Linux, Solaris	No	Freeware	Oracle Developer Studio
Absoft Pro Fortran	Absoft	Discontinued	Yes	Linux, macOS	Yes	Proprietary	Yes
G95	Andy Vaught	Inactive	Yes	Yes	Yes	GPL	No
GCC (GNU Fortran)	GNU Project	Current	Yes	Yes	Yes	GPLv3	Photran (part of Eclipse), Simply Fortran, Lahey Fortran
Intel Fortran Compiler Classic (ifort)	Intel	Current	Yes	Linux and macOS	No	Freeware, optional priority support	Yes (plugins), Visual Studio on Windows, Eclipse on Linux, XCode on Mac
Open64	Google, HP, Intel, Nvidia, PathScale, Tsinghua University and others	Finished	No	Yes	Yes	GPL	No
Classic Flang	LLVM Project	Current	Yes	Yes	Yes	NCSA	Yes
LLVM Flang	LLVM Project	Current	Yes	Yes	Yes	NCSA	Yes
LFortran	The LFortran team	Current	Yes	Yes	Yes	BSD	Yes
FTN95	Silverfrost	Current	Yes	No	No	Proprietary	Yes
NAG Fortran Compiler	Numerical Algorithms Group	Current	Yes	Linux and macOS	No	Proprietary	Yes
Tandem Fortran	Tandem Computers	Discontinued	No	?	Guardian, NonStop Kernel, NonStop OS	Proprietary	No
XL Fortran	IBM	Current	No	Linux (Power and AIX	No	Proprietary	Eclipse
MCP	Unisys	Discontinued	No	No	MCP	Proprietary	CANDE
Open Watcom	Sybase and Open Watcom Contributors	Current	Yes	Yes	DOS, OS/2	Sybase Open Watcom Public License	on Windows, OS/2
Cray	Cray	Current	Yes	Yes	Yes	Proprietary	Yes

== Go compilers ==
Compiler	Working state	Operating system			License type
Compiler	Working state	Windows	Unix-like	Other	License type
Gc	Current	Yes	Yes	Yes	BSD 3-Clause
GCC (gccgo)	Current	MinGW, Cygwin	Yes	Yes	GPL
Gold	Current	Yes	Linux, macOS, Android, iOS	Yes (WebAssembly)	Proprietary
LLVM (llgo)	Dropped	No	Yes	No	NCSA

== Haskell compilers ==
Compiler	Author	Windows	Unix-like	Other OSs	License type	Actively maintained?
GHC	GHC	Yes	Yes	No	Open source	Yes
YHC	YHC	Yes	Yes	No	Open source	No

== ISLISP compilers and interpreters ==
Name	Author	Working state	Target	Written in	Operating system			License type	Standard conformance
Name	Author	Working state	Target	Written in	Windows	Unix-like	Other	License type	Standard conformance
Easy-ISLisp	Kenichi Sasagawa	Current	C, bytecode	C, Lisp	No	Linux, macOS, OpenBSD	No	BSD 2-Clause	Yes
OpenLisp	Eligis	Current	C, bytecode	C, Lisp	Yes	macOS, Linux, BSD, AIX, Solaris, QNX	?	Proprietary	Yes

== Java compilers ==
Compiler	Author	Working state	Windows	Unix-like	Other OSs	License type	IDE?
Edison Design Group	Edison Design Group	Discontinued	Yes	Yes	Yes	Proprietary	No
GCC (gcj)	GNU Project	Inactive	No	Yes	No	GPL	No
javac	Sun Microsystems (Owned by Oracle)	Current	Yes	Yes	Yes	BCL	Yes
javac OpenJDK	Sun Microsystems (Owned by Oracle)	Current	Yes	Yes	Yes	GPLv2	Yes
Jikes	IBM	Inactive	?	Yes	?	IPL	?
Iodine	RemObjects	Current	Yes	Yes (Linux, macOS, Android, iOS)	Yes (WebAssembly)	Proprietary	Yes

== Pascal compilers ==
Compiler	Author	Windows	Unix-like	Other OSs	License type	IDE?
Amsterdam Compiler Kit	Andrew Tanenbaum; Ceriel Jacobs	No	Yes	Yes	BSD	No
Delphi	Embarcadero (CodeGear)	Yes	Yes (Linux, Mac OS)	Yes (iOS, Android)	Proprietary	Yes
Oxygene (formerly Delphi Prism)	RemObjects	Yes	Yes (Linux, macOS, Android, IOS)	Yes (WebAssembly)	Proprietary	Yes
Free Pascal	Florian Paul Klämpfl	Yes	Yes	Yes (OS/2, FreeBSD, Solaris, Haiku, Android, DOS, etc. (Note: Further details on supported hosts and targets may be found on the lists of official installers and supported targets.))	GPL	FPIDE, Lazarus, Geany (on Ubuntu)
GCC (GNU Pascal)	GNU Project	Yes	Yes	Yes	GPL	No
Kylix	Borland (CodeGear)	No	Yes (Linux)	No	Proprietary	Yes
Turbo Pascal for Windows	Borland (CodeGear)	Yes (3.x)	No	No	Proprietary	Yes
Microsoft Pascal	Microsoft	No	No	Yes (DOS)	Proprietary	Yes
Tandem Pascal	Tandem Computers	No	?	Guardian, NonStop Kernel	Proprietary	?
VSI Pascal	VMS Software Inc	No	No	Yes (OpenVMS)	Proprietary	Yes
Turbo Pascal	CodeGear (Borland)	No	No	Yes	Freeware	Yes
Vector Pascal	Glasgow University	Yes	Yes	No	OpenSource	No
Virtual Pascal	Vitaly Miryanov	Yes	Yes	Yes (OS/2)	Freeware	Yes
MCP	Unisys	No	No	MCP	Proprietary	CANDE

== PHP compilers ==
Compiler	Author	Windows	Unix-like	Other OSs	License type	IDE?
Phalanger	Devsense	Yes	No	Partial	Apache 2.0	Yes
PeachPie	iolevel	Yes	Yes	Yes	Apache 2.0	Yes

== PL/I compilers ==
Compiler	Author	Windows	Unix-like	Other OSs	License type	IDE?
Iron Spring PL/I for Linux and OS/2 (up to PL/I version 1.4.0)	Iron Spring Software	No	Linux	OS/2 Warp and EComStation	Proprietary; library source is LGPL	No
GCC (pl1gcc)	Henrik Sorensen	Yes	Yes	Yes	GPL	No

== Python compilers and interpreters ==
Compiler	Author	Target	Windows	Unix-like	Other OSs	License type	IDE?
Cython		C	Yes	Yes	Yes	PSFL	No
IronPython		CLI	Yes	Yes	Yes (CLI)	Apache 2.0	No
Jython		JVM	Yes	Yes	Yes (JVM)	PSFL	No
Nuitka	Kay Hayen	C, C++	Yes	Yes	Yes	Apache 2.0	No
Numba	Anaconda	LLVM (JIT)	Yes	Yes	Yes	BSD 2-Clause	No
Psyco	Armin Rigo; Christian Tismer	x86-32 (JIT)	Yes	Yes	Yes	MIT	No
PyPy		Own VM (JIT)	Yes	Yes	Yes	MIT	No
Shed Skin		C++	Yes	Yes	Yes	GPLv3 and BSD	No

== Ruby compilers and interpreters ==
Compiler	Author	Target	Windows	Unix-like	Other OSs	License type
YARV	Koichi Sasada	bytecode	Yes	Yes	Yes	Ruby License
IronRuby	Microsoft	.NET	Yes	Yes	Yes	Apache 2.0
JRuby		JVM	Yes	Yes	Yes	EPL, GPL, LGPL
Mruby	Yukihiro Matsumoto	bytecode	Yes	Yes	Yes	MIT

== Rust compilers ==
Compiler	Author	Windows	Unix-like	Other OSs	Bare machine	License type
rustc	Rust Foundation	Yes	Yes	Yes	Yes	Apache License
GCC Rust	GNU Project	MinGW, Cygwin, WSL	Yes	No	Yes	GPL

== Scheme compilers and interpreters ==
Compiler	Author	Target	Windows	Unix-like	Other OSs	License type	IDE?
Bigloo	Manuel Serrano	native, bytecode	Yes	Yes	?	GPL (compiler) and LGPL (runtime)	No
Chez Scheme	R. Kent Dybvig	native	Yes	Yes	No	Apache 2.0	No
Chicken	The Chicken Team	C	Yes	Yes	?	BSD	No
Gambit	Marc Feeley	C	Yes	Yes	?	LGPL	No
GNU Guile	GNU Project	bytecode	Yes	Yes	?	LGPL	No
Ikarus	Abdulaziz Ghuloum	native	Yes	Yes	?	GPL	No
IronScheme	Llewellyn Pritchard	CLI	Yes	Yes	Yes (Common Language Infrastructure)	Ms-PL	No
JScheme	Ken Anderson, Tim Hickey, Peter Norvig	bytecode	Yes	Yes	Yes (JVM)	zlib License	No
Kawa	Per Bothner	bytecode	Yes	Yes	Yes (JVM)	MIT	No
MIT/GNU Scheme	GNU Project	native	Yes	Yes	?	GPL	No
Racket	PLT Inc.	bytecode + JIT	Yes	Yes	macOS, Microsoft Windows	LGPL	DrRacket
Scheme 48	Richard Kelsey, Jonathan Rees	C, bytecode	Yes	Yes	?	BSD	No
SCM	Aubrey Jaffer	C	Yes	Yes	AmigaOS, Atari ST, Classic Mac OS, DOS, OS/2, NOS/VE, OpenVMS	LGPL	No
SISC	Scott G. Miller, Matthias Radestock	bytecode	Yes	Yes	Yes (JVM)	GPL and MPL	No
Stalin	Jeffrey Mark Siskind	C	?	Yes	?	LGPL	No
STklos	Erick Gallesio	bytecode	?	Yes	?	GPL	No

Interpreter	Author	Windows	Unix-like	Other OSs	License type	IDE?
Gauche	Shiro Kawai	Yes	Yes	?	BSD	No
Petite Chez Scheme	R. Kent Dybvig	Yes	Yes	No	Apache 2.0	No
TinyScheme	?	?	?	Yes	BSD	No

== Smalltalk compilers ==
Compiler	Author	Target	Windows	Unix-like	Other OSs	License type	IDE?
Pharo	Pharo Team	VM	Yes	Yes	Yes	MIT License	Yes
GNU Smalltalk	GNU Smalltalk project	bytecode + JIT	Yes	Yes	No	GPL	No
VisualWorks	Cincom Systems	?	Yes	Yes	Yes	Proprietary	Yes
Smalltalk MT	ObjectConnect	native	Yes	No	No	Proprietary	Yes

== Swift compilers ==
Compiler	Author	Target	Windows	Unix-like	Other OSs	License type	IDE?
swiftc	Apple Inc. and community	native, WebAssembly	Yes	Yes	Yes	Apache 2.0	Yes
Silver	RemObjects	native, CLI, JVM, WebAssembly	Yes	Yes	Yes	Proprietary	Yes

== Tcl interpreters ==
Interpreter	Author	Windows	Unix-like	Other OSs	License type
ActiveTcl	ActiveState	Yes	Yes	Yes	Noncommercial or proprietary
Tclsh	MKS and many others	Yes	Yes	Yes	Proprietary and/or free
Wish	Mary Gray	Yes	Yes	Yes	BSD

== Command language interpreters ==
Interpreter	Author	Windows	Unix-like	Other OSs	License type
DCL (Digital Control Language)	Digital	No	No	OpenVMS, RSX-11M, RSTS/E	Proprietary
TACL (Tandem Advanced Command Language)	Tandem Computers	No	No	Guardian, NonStop Kernel, NonStop OS	Proprietary

== Rexx interpreters ==
Interpreter	Author	Windows	Unix-like	Other OSs	License type
Amiga ARexx	Commodore	No	No	Yes	Proprietary
ObjectRexx	IBM	Yes	?	Yes	Proprietary
Open Object Rexx	OO Organisation	Yes	Yes	No	CPL

== CLI compilers ==
Compiler	Author	Working state	Operating system			License type	IDE?
Compiler	Author	Working state	Windows	Unix-like	Other OSs	License type	IDE?
Visual Studio	Microsoft	Current	Yes	No	No	Proprietary	Yes
Mono	Mono	Current	Yes	Yes	No	MIT	Yes
Delphi Prism	RemObjects	Current	Yes	Yes	Yes	Proprietary	Yes
Portable.NET	DotGNU	Inactive	Yes	Yes	No	GPL	Unknown

== Source-to-source compilers ==
This list is incomplete. A more extensive list of source-to-source compilers can be found here.

Compiler	Author	Target Input	Target Output	Auto-Parallelizer	Windows	Unix-like	Other OSs	License type	Framework?
DMS Software Reengineering Toolkit	Semantic Designs	C/C++, COBOL, PL/I, many others	Arbitrary languages	No	Yes	Yes	Yes	Proprietary	Yes
ROSE	Lawrence Livermore National Laboratory	C, Fortran, and more	C/C++, Fortran, and more	Yes	No	Yes	Yes	BSD	Yes

== Free/libre and open source compilers ==
Production quality, free/libre and open source compilers.

- Amsterdam Compiler Kit (ACK) [C, Pascal, Modula-2, Occam, and BASIC] [Unix-like]
- Clang C/C++/Objective-C Compiler
- AMD Optimizing C/C++ Compiler
- FreeBASIC [Basic] [DOS/Linux/Windows]
- Free Pascal [Pascal] [DOS/Linux/Windows(32/64/CE)/MacOS/NDS/GBA/..(and many more)]
- GNU Compiler Collection (GCC): C (gcc), C++ (g++), Objective-C, Objective-C++, Fortran (gfortran), Ada (GNAT), Go (gccgo), D (gdc, since 9.1), Modula-2 (gm2, since 13.1), COBOL (gcobol, since 15.1), Rust (gccrs, since 15.1), and ALGOL 68 (ga68, since 16.1). Also available, but not in standard are: Java (gcj), Pascal (gpc), Mercury, Modula-3, VHDL and PL/I; Linux, the BSDs, macOS, NeXTSTEP, Windows and BeOS, among others
- Local C compiler [C] [Linux, Windows]
- The LLVM Compiler Infrastructure which is also frequently used for research
- Portable C Compiler [C] [Unix-like]
- Open Watcom [C, C++, and Fortran] [Windows and OS/2, Linux/FreeBSD WIP]
- TenDRA [C/C++] [Unix-like]
- Tiny C Compiler [C] [Linux, Windows]
- Open64, supported by AMD on Linux.
- XPL PL/I dialect (several systems)
- Swift [Apple OSes, Linux, Windows (as of version 5.3)]

== Research compilers ==
Research compilers are mostly not robust or complete enough to handle real, large applications. They are used mostly for fast prototyping new language features and new optimizations in research areas.

- Open64: A popular research compiler. Open64 merges the open source changes from the PathScale compiler mentioned.
- ROSE: an open source compiler framework to generate source-to-source analyzers and translators for C/C++ and Fortran, developed at Lawrence Livermore National Laboratory
- MILEPOST GCC: interactive plugin-based open-source research compiler that combines the strength of GCC and the flexibility of the common Interactive Compilation Interface that transforms production compilers into interactive research toolsets.
- Interactive Compilation Interface – a plugin system with high-level API to transform production-quality compilers such as GCC into powerful and stable research infrastructure while avoiding developing new research compilers from scratch
- Phoenix optimization and analysis framework by Microsoft
- Edison Design Group: provides production-quality front end compilers for C, C++, and Java (a number of the compilers listed on this page use front end source code from Edison Design Group). Additionally, Edison Design Group makes their proprietary software available for research uses.

== See also ==
- Comparison of integrated development environments
- List of integrated development environments
- List of command-line interpreters
- List of open-source compilers and assemblers
- List of open-source programming languages
