= List of Fortran software and tools =

Fortran software and development tools

This is a list of Fortran software and tools, including IDEs, compilers, libraries, debugging tools, numerical and scientific computing tools, and related projects.

== Fortran compilers ==
- Absoft Pro Fortran — Absoft Pro Fortran is discontinued and ran on Linux and macOS
- AOCC — from AMD
- Classic Flang — part of the LLVM Project
- LLVM Flang — part of the LLVM Project
- Fortran 77 — Fortran 77 was developed by Digital Equipment Corporation, it is discontinued.
- G95 – portable open-source Fortran 95 compiler
- GCC (GNU Fortran)
- PGI compilers – NVIDIA developed compilers after acquiring The Portland Group
- IBM XL Fortran — IBM XL Fortran is current and runs on Linux (Power/AIX) and integrates with Eclipse
- Intel Fortran Compiler – part of Intel OneAPI HPC toolkit
- LFortran — LFortran is current, cross-platform, and has IDE support.
- MinGW – cross compiler and forked into Mingw-w64
- nAG Fortran Compiler - from nAG
- Open64 — Open64 is an open-source compiler that has been terminated and ran on Linux
- Open Watcom — Open Watcom is current, runs on MS-DOS and OS/2, and has IDE support.
- Oracle Fortran — Oracle Fortran is discontinued, ran on Linux and Solaris.
- ROSE — source-to-source compiler framework developed at Lawrence Livermore National Laboratory
- Silverfrost FTN95 — FTN95 from Silverfrost is current, runs on Windows, and has IDE support.

== Integrated development environments (IDEs) and editors ==
- Code::Blocks — supports Fortran with plugins
- Eclipse IDE — with Fortran support via Photran
- Emacs — extensible text editor with built-in Fortran modes and support for modern tooling via language servers
- Geany — lightweight cross-platform IDE based on GTK
- IntelliJ IDEA — cross-platform IDE by JetBrains with Fortran pluggin
- KDevelop — KDE-based IDE
- NetBeans — Apache software foundation IDE with Fortran configuration
- OpenWatcom — IDE and compiler suite for C, C++, and Fortran
- Simply Fortran — standalone Fortran IDE for Windows, Linux, and macOS
- Vim — modal text editor with native Fortran syntax support and extensive plugin-based development features
- Visual Studio — with Intel Fortran integration
- Visual Studio Code — supports Fortran via extensions

== Mathematical libraries ==
- ARPACK
- Automatically Tuned Linear Algebra Software
- BLAS
- BLIS
- EISPACK
- Harwell Subroutine Library
- IMSL Numerical Libraries
- LAPACK
- Librsb
- LINPACK
- Lis
- Math Kernel Library
- MINPACK
- NAG Fortran Library
- Netlib
- ODEPACK
- PETSc
- pFUnit
- QUADPACK
- SLATEC
- SLICOT
- SOFA

== Scientific libraries ==
- ABINIT — software suite to calculate optical, mechanical, vibrational, and other observable properties of materials
- Cantera — chemical kinetics, thermodynamics, and transport tool suite
- CERN Program Library — collection of Fortran libraries for physics applications from CERN
- CP2K — quantum chemistry and solid-state physics software package for atomistic simulations
- Dalton — molecular electronic structure program
- FFTPACK — subroutines for the fast Fourier transform
- Kinetic PreProcessor – open-source software tool used in atmospheric chemistry
- MESA — Modules for Experiments in Stellar Astrophysics
- Nek5000 — MPI parallel higher-order spectral element CFD solver
- NWChem — open-source high-performance computational chemistry software
- Octopus — real-space Time-Dependent Density Functional Theory code
- MODTRAN – model atmospheric propagation of electromagnetic radiation
- MOLCAS — quantum chemistry software package for multiconfigurational electronic structure calculations
- NOVAS – software library for astrometry-related numerical computations
- Physics Analysis Workstation – data analysis and graphical presentation in high-energy physics
- Quantum ESPRESSO — integrated suite for electronic-structure calculations and materials modeling
- SIESTA — first-principles materials simulation code using density functional theory
- Tinker — software tools for molecular design

== Debugging and performance tools ==
- GDB — GNU Debugger with Fortran support
- Valgrind — memory debugging and profiling tool
- VTune Profiler — performance analysis tool
- Allinea Forge — debugger and profiler for HPC applications

== Build and package management ==
- Autotools — build system supporting Fortran projects
- CMake — cross-platform build system supporting Fortran
- Make — build automation tool
- Spack — package manager for HPC software including Fortran libraries

== Machine learning and AI libraries ==
- Athena
- Fiats (Functional Inference And Training for Surrogates)
- FNN (Fortran Neural Network)
- FortNN
- Fortran-TF-lib (Fortran interface to TensorFlow)
- FTorch (Fortran interface to PyTorch)
- MlFortran
- RoseNNa

== Parallel and high-performance computing tools ==
- MPI Fortran bindings — standard interface for distributed-memory parallelism
- OpenMP — shared-memory parallel programming support through compiler directives
- Coarray Fortran — parallel programming model introduced in Fortran 2008
- ScaLAPACK — parallel linear algebra package built on top of LAPACK

== Testing frameworks ==
- FUnit — open-source unit testing framework developed at NASA’s Langley Research Center, for Fortran 90, 95, and 2003.
- pFUnit — unit testing framework for Fortran, modeled after JUnit

== Documentation and code analysis tools ==
- FORD — automatic documentation generator for modern Fortran projects
- SQuORE — software quality and management platform with code analysis support
- Understand — static analysis and code comprehension tool for large Fortran projects

== See also ==
- Comparison of programming languages
- Fortran programming language on Wikibooks
- High-performance computing
- List of Fortran books
- Lists of programming software development tools by language
- Numerical analysis
