= AOCC =

AOCC may refer to:

- American Orthodox Catholic Church
- AMD Optimizing C/C++ Compiler
- American Overseas Clinics Corporation, run by John A. Shaw
