= LFortran =

Fortran compiler

- Developers: The LFortran team, led by Ondřej Čertík
- Initial release: October 9, 2018
- Stable release: 0.49.0 (alpha) / March 15, 2025
- Repository: github.com/lfortran/lfortran
- Written in: C++
- Operating system: Cross-platform
- Type: Compiler
- License: BSD License
- Website: www.lfortran.org

LFortran is an open-source next-generation interactive Fortran compiler based on LLVM. A unique feature is that it can execute the user’s code interactively to allow exploratory work, in addition to compiling it to binaries to run the code on modern architectures such as multi-core CPUs and GPUs. It can be used via WebAssembly and is available on Compiler Explorer.

LFortran is still in the alpha phase. It supports most of Fortran 95 and many features of later standards. It will reach beta when it can reliably compile 10 production-grade, third-party packages used in the scientific community and industry. The current status is 8/10:

- Legacy (February, 2023) and modern Minpack (May, 2023) --- LFortran Breakthrough: Now Building Legacy and Modern Minpack
- fastGPT (September, 2023) --- LFortran Compiles fastGPT
- dftatom (October, 2023) --- LFortran Compiles dftatom
- SciPy (60%, January, 2024) --- LFortran Compiles 60% of SciPy
- stdlib (85%, April, 2024) --- LFortran Compiles stdlib
- SNAP (August, 2024) --- LFortran now compiles SNAP
- PRIMA (March, 2025) --- LFortran compiles PRIMA

Despite being alpha, LFortran has been on the radar of NASA as a representative of compilers supporting type-safe generic programming in Fortran, and on that of SciPy, which hopes it can help deal with the large amount of Fortran libraries that SciPy relies on.

The LFortran project works closely with the US Fortran Standards Committee (J3). It is a NumFOCUS Sponsored Project since 2020. LFortran is a member of the Lcompilers family, and its siblings include LPython and LC.

== See also ==
- Flang
- Fortran
- LLVM
