= PathScale =

PathScale EKOPath Compiler
- Developer: PathScale Inc.
- Release: 2003; 23 years ago
- Stable release: 5.0.0 / December 5, 2013; 12 years ago
- Written in: C and C++
- Operating system: Linux, FreeBSD, and Solaris
- Platform: x86-64
- Type: Compiler
- Website: www.pathscale.com

PathScale Inc. was a company that developed a highly optimizing C, C++, and Fortran compiler suite for the x86-64 microprocessor architectures. It derives from the SGI compilers for the MIPS architecture R10000 processor, called MIPSPro.

== History ==
PathScale was founded in 2001 as Key Research and its original mission was to develop clustered Linux server solutions based on a low-cost 64-bit design. In late 2003 the company came out of stealth mode and was called PathScale. The word PathScale is descriptive of the company's original design goals for clusters. In early 2003 with the success of the AMD Opteron, efforts at the company switched to other products like high-performance 64-bit compilers.

The seeds of the company were sown in the early 1980s at the Lawrence Livermore National Laboratory, where four of the company's seven founders worked together building the S1 supercomputer. The first chief technical officer at PathScale, Tom McWilliams, had the initial idea for the company and incorporated in July 2001. He added three of his LLNL colleagues (Jeff Rubin, Jeff Broughton, Fred Chow) to the company shortly thereafter. McWilliams had been a company founder at Valid Logic Systems and Key Computer and worked at SGI, Sun Microsystems and Amdahl Corporation. Chow was formerly chief scientist for compilers at SGI and MIPS.

PathScale Inc. was acquired and re-sold several times. First by QLogic in February 2006, for about $109 million. A network technology called InfiniPath was marketed as TrueScale by QLogic, and then sold to Intel and became the basis of Omni-Path. The compiler technology was acquired by SiCortex in August 2007, and by Cray in August 2009, when SiCortex was liquidated. Cray owned the intellectual property until March 2012 when a new PathScale Inc. acquired all assets.

In May 2011, the FreeBSD Foundation and NetBSD Foundation were granted the use of the libcxxrt C++ runtime under a 2-clause BSD license, allowing a move away from the previous GPL-licensed runtime.

On June 13, 2011, PathScale announced that the EKOPath 4 compiler suite would become open source software and licensed under the GPL.

The suite contains:

- C, C++, and Fortran 77/90/95/2003 (partial) compilers
- Complete support for OpenMP 2.5 (including WORKSHARE)
- Complete support for 64-bit and 32-bit x86 compilation
- Code generation for AMD64 ABI, AMD Opteron, and Intel EM64T
- Optimized AMD Core Math Library
- Advanced multi-threaded debugger PathDB
- Compatible with GNU/gcc toolchain and popular third-party debuggers
- Supported on SUSE, Red Hat, and Ubuntu

== See also ==
- List of compilers
- GPGPU
- OpenMP
- High-performance computing
