= University of Illinois/NCSA Open Source License =

Free software license

- SPDX identifier: NCSA
- FSF approved: Yes
- OSI approved: Yes
- GPL compatible: Yes
- Copyleft: No
- Website: otm.illinois.edu/uiuc_openSource

The University of Illinois/NCSA Open Source License is a permissive free software license, based on the MIT/X11 license and the 3-clause BSD license. By combining parts of these two licenses, it attempts to be clearer and more concise than either.

The license is the result of efforts by a University of Illinois committee set up in 2001. The intention was to create a new license standard for both the National Center for Supercomputing Applications (NCSA) and the worldwide software community. It was formally certified as an open-source license during a March 28, 2002 board meeting of the Open Source Initiative (OSI).

Source code under the NCSA license can be incorporated into proprietary products without the reciprocity requirements that copyleft free software licenses raise. The license is compatible with all versions of the GNU General Public License. Notable software using the license includes LLVM and Clang (version 8.0.1 or earlier).

== Terms ==
The following is a license template. On an actual license the sections within angle brackets (year, owner organization name, etc.) will be filled out.

Copyright (c) <YEAR> <OWNER ORGANIZATION NAME>.  All rights reserved.

Developed by: <NAME OF DEVELOPMENT GROUP>
              <NAME OF INSTITUTION>
              <URL FOR DEVELOPMENT GROUP/INSTITUTION>

Permission is hereby granted, free of charge, to any person obtaining a copy of
this software and associated documentation files (the "Software"), to deal with
the Software without restriction, including without limitation the rights
to use, copy, modify, merge, publish, distribute, sublicense, and/or sell copies
of the Software, and to permit persons to whom the Software is furnished to
do so, subject to the following conditions:
* Redistributions of source code must retain the above copyright notice,
  this list of conditions and the following disclaimers.
* Redistributions in binary form must reproduce the above copyright notice,
  this list of conditions and the following disclaimers in the documentation
  and/or other materials provided with the distribution.
* Neither the names of <NAME OF DEVELOPMENT GROUP>, <NAME OF INSTITUTION>,
  nor the names of its contributors may be used to endorse or promote products
  derived from this Software without specific prior written permission.

THE SOFTWARE IS PROVIDED "AS IS", WITHOUT WARRANTY OF ANY KIND, EXPRESS OR
IMPLIED, INCLUDING BUT NOT LIMITED TO THE WARRANTIES OF MERCHANTABILITY,
FITNESS FOR A PARTICULAR PURPOSE AND NONINFRINGEMENT.  IN NO EVENT SHALL THE
CONTRIBUTORS OR COPYRIGHT HOLDERS BE LIABLE FOR ANY CLAIM, DAMAGES OR OTHER
LIABILITY, WHETHER IN AN ACTION OF CONTRACT, TORT OR OTHERWISE, ARISING FROM,
OUT OF OR IN CONNECTION WITH THE SOFTWARE OR THE USE OR OTHER DEALINGS WITH THE
SOFTWARE.

== See also ==
- Software using the University of Illinois/NCSA Open Source License (category)
