= HP aC++ =

aC++ Compiler
- Developer(s): Hewlett-Packard
- Operating system: HP-UX
- Available in: Multilingual
- Type: Software development
- License: Proprietary
- Website: www.hp.com/go/acc

The HP C/aC++ Developer's Bundle includes the utilities for creating C and C++ programs. These tools provide features such as performance analysis, code analysis, and the HP-UX Developer's Toolkit. This product runs on HP-UX 11i v3, on the HPE Integrity Servers and HP 9000 systems.

== Products ==
The HP C/aC++ Developer's Bundle includes:

- HP C/ANSI C compiler
- HP aC++ compiler
- HP-UX Developer's Toolkit
- HP WDB debugger
- HP Caliper performance analyzer
- HP Code Advisor (cadvise) analysis tool
