= IBM XL C/C++ Compilers =

XL C/C++ Compilers and Open XL C/C++ Compilers
- Developer: IBM
- Stable release: 17.1.1 (AIX on Power, Linux on Power), 1.1 (z/OS) / September 2022; 3 years ago (Linux on Power), November 2022; 3 years ago (AIX on Power), May 2022; 3 years ago (z/OS)
- Operating system: Cross-platform: Linux (POWER and z architectures), AIX, Blue Gene/Q, z/OS, and z/VM
- Available in: Multilingual
- Type: Software development
- License: Proprietary
- Website: www.ibm.com/products/c-and-c-plus-plus-compiler-family

XL C/C++ is the name of IBM's proprietary optimizing C/C++ compilers for IBM-supported environments.

== Compiler ==
The IBM XL compilers are built from modularized components consisting of front ends (for different programming languages), a platform-agnostic high-level optimizer, and platform-specific low-level optimizers/code generators to target specific hardware and operating systems. The XL C/C++ compilers target POWER, BlueGene/Q, and IBM Z hardware architectures.

=== Optimization ===
A common high level optimizer across the POWER and z/OS XL C/C++ compilers optimizes the source program using platform-agnostic optimizations such as interprocedural analysis, profile-directed feedback, and loop and vector optimizations.

A low-level optimizer on each platform performs function-level optimizations and generates optimized code for a specific operating system and hardware platforms.

The particular optimizations performed for any given compilation depend upon the optimization level chosen under option control (O2 to O5) along with any other optimization-related options, such as those for interprocedural analysis or loop optimizations.

The XL compilers on AIX have delivered, for example, SPEC CPU2006 Floating Point score of 71.5 in May 2010 and score of 4051 in August 2006.

=== IBM i ===
The XL compiler on IBM i series for C/C++, is called ixlc. It is a qsh CLI based on the same assets than the CRTCPPMOD / CRTPGM system commands. It is compatible with C++98, and partially with C++11. It was discontinued in 2011.

=== IBM AIX and Linux on Power ===
Current versions of XL C/C++ for AIX on Power (17.1.1) and XL C/C++ for Linux on Power (17.1.1), are based on open-source Clang front-end (part of the Clang/LLVM open source project). In particular, XL C/C++ for AIX 17.1.0 is based on LLVM Clang 13. Both compilers provide support for C11, C++03, C++11, and C++14. Note that while XL C/C++ for Linux on Power supports at least C++17, some library features later than C++14 may be unavailable under XL C/C++ for AIX on Power.

==== Licensing ====
In June 2016, IBM introduced XL C/C++ for Linux Community Edition, which is a no-charge and fully functional edition for unlimited production use.

A new monthly pricing option is offered in XL C/C++ for AIX 16.1 and XL Fortran for AIX 16.1 to provide more flexibility for cloud-based use cases. This pricing model is on a term or subscription basis, with Software Subscription and Support included.

IBM Open XL compilers offer monthly licenses (per Virtual Processor Core); meanwhile, user-based licenses (i.e. Authorized user and Concurrent user licenses) are still available.

=== IBM Z ===
The z/OS XL C/C++ compiler exploits the IBM Z® systems. It enables the development of high-performing business applications and system programs on z/OS while maximizing hardware use and improving application performance. IBM z/OS XL C/C++ uses services provided by the z/OS Language Environment® and Runtime Library Extensions base elements. It supports embedded CICS® and SQL statements in the C/C++ source, which simplifies the operation of C/C++ within CICS and Db2® environments. It works in concert with the IBM Application Delivery Foundation for z/OS.

IBM® Open XL C/C++ 1.1 for z/OS® is the newest C/C++ compiler on z/OS that is fully based on the open source LLVM infrastructure. Open XL C/C++ 1.1 supports up to C17/C18 and C++17 language standard features and leverages the features of the IBM z16™ mainframe, ideal for z/OS UNIX System Services users porting applications from distributed platforms. Open XL C/C++ 1.1 is available as a no-charge add-on feature for users who have enabled the z/OS XL C/C++ (an optionally priced feature) on z/OS 2.4 or z/OS 2.5.

== Products ==
XL C/C++ and Open XL C/C++ compiler families consist of the following products, with most recent version and release dates where known:

- Open XL C/C++ for z/OS (Version 1.1, May 2022)
- Open XL C/C++ for AIX on Power (Version 17.1.1, Nov 2022)
- Open XL C/C++ for Linux on Power (Version 17.1.1, August 2022)
- XL C for AIX (Version 13.1.3, December 2015)
- XL C/C++ 2.4.1 for z/OS 2.4 (Dec 2019)
- z/OS XL C/C++ (Version 2.4, Sep 2019)
- XL C/C++ for z/VM (Version 1.3, December 2011)
- XL C/C++ for Linux on z Systems (Version 1.2, 2016)
- XL C/C++ for Blue Gene/Q (Version 12.1, June 2012)
- XL C/C++ Advanced Edition for Blue Gene (Version 9.0, September 2007, withdrawn August 2009)

== See also ==
- IBM VisualAge – the predecessor product
- List of compilers
