= SimFiT =

Simfit
- Developer(s): William G. Bardsley, University of Manchester
- Stable release: 8.1.4 / July, 2024
- Operating system: Windows
- Type: numerical analysis
- License: GNU AGPL

Simfit is a free open-source Windows package for simulation, curve fitting, statistics, and plotting, using a library of models or user-defined mathematical equations. Simfit has been developed by Bill Bardsley of the University of Manchester. Although it is written for Windows, it can easily be installed and used on Linux machines via WINE.

Simfit is developed using Silverfrost Limited's FTN95 Fortran Compiler and is currently featured on their website as a showcased application. The graphical functionality in Simfit has been released as a Fortran library called Simdem which allows the programmer to produce charts and graphs with just a few lines of Fortran. A version of Simdem is shipped with the Windows version of the NAG Fortran Builder.

A Spanish-language version of Simfit is maintained by a team in Salamanca.

At Version 8.1.1 a simplified version of simfit called sv_simfit designed for first-time users is bundled with the main simfit package.
