= PFUnit =

Fortran framework for unit testing

pFUnit is a Fortran programming language framework for unit testing following the xUnit model. Capabilities include parallel execution using MPI and OpenMP. Development began at NASA Goddard Space Flight Center in 2005. The framework makes extensive use of modern standard features of Fortran (2003, 2008), like support for object-oriented programming. A python-based preprocessor provides directives reminiscent of other xUnit testing frameworks (e.g. @assert), as well as support for parameterized test cases. pFUnit can be built using either a GNU make or CMake process.

It is published under the NASA Open Source Agreement version 1.3.

== See also ==
- List of unit testing frameworks
- Fortran
