= Edison Design Group =

American company

- Type: Private
- Industry: Software
- Founded: 1988
- Headquarters: Scotch Plains, New Jersey
- Key people: J. Stephen Adamczyk; John Spicer; Daveed Vandevoorde
- Products: Compiler front ends
- Number of employees: 6
- Website: www.edg.com

The Edison Design Group (EDG) is an American company that makes compiler front ends (preprocessing and parsing) for C++ and formerly Java and Fortran. Their front ends are widely used in commercially available compilers and code analysis tools. Users include the Intel C++ compiler, Microsoft Visual C++ (IntelliSense), NVIDIA CUDA Compiler, SGI MIPSpro, The Portland Group, and Comeau C++. They are widely known for having the first, and likely only, front end to implement the unused until C++20 export keyword of C++.

EDG was founded in 1988 in New Jersey by J. Stephen "Steve" Adamczyk, a 1974 B.S. graduate of the Massachusetts Institute of Technology, a 1977 M.S. graduate of the Indiana University Bloomington, and an experienced compiler engineer who had worked for Advanced Computer Techniques in New York City.

Other employees include John Spicer and Daveed Vandevoorde.

The company announced in 2025 that it will be closing in 2026 and its C++ compiler front end will be open sourced.

== See also ==
- Dinkumware, supplier of the standard library for several commercial C/C++ compilers
