= IBM XL Fortran =

XL Fortran is the name of IBM's proprietary optimizing Fortran compiler for IBM-supported environments, including Linux for little-endian distributions and AIX.

== Features ==
- Tuning for Power ISA
- Fortran language standard support (XL Fortran's Fortran 2008 Compliance Status and XL Fortran's TS 29113 Compliance Status)
- CUDA Fortran support
- OpenMP API support
- Five optimization levels (-O0,-O2,-O3,-O4,-O5)
- Profile-directed feedback optimization
- Interprocedural optimization and inlining
- High order transformations
