= MVAPICH =

Open-source parallel computing library

- Stable release: 3.0 / February 16, 2024; 17 months ago
- Operating system: Unix, Linux
- Type: Library
- License: New BSD License (free software)
- Website: mvapich.cse.ohio-state.edu,mug.mvapich.cse.ohio-state.edu

MVAPICH, also known as MVAPICH2, is a BSD-licensed implementation of the MPI standard developed by Ohio State University. MVAPICH comes in a number of flavors:

- MVAPICH2 ("renamed" as "MVAPICH" with the 3.0 releases), with support for InfiniBand, iWARP, RoCE, and Intel Omni-Path
- MVAPICH2-X, with support for PGAS and OpenSHMEM
- MVAPICH2-GDR, with support for InfiniBand and NVIDIA and AMD GPUs
- MVAPICH-PLUS, an enhanced fusing of MVAPICH2-X and MVAPICH2-GDR beginning its releases in 2023/24 with the 3.0 series.
- MVAPICH2-MIC, with support for InfiniBand and Intel MIC
- MVAPICH2-Virt, with support for InfiniBand and SR-IOV
- MVAPICH2-EA, which is energy-aware and supports InfiniBand, iWARP, and RoCE

== See also ==
- Open MPI
- MPICH
