= G95 (disambiguation) =

G95 is a Fortran 95 compiler.

G95 may also refer to:

- G95 Capital Area Loop Expressway, a road in China
- Heckler & Koch G95, a variant of the Heckler & Koch HK416 assault rifle
- HMS Parker (G95), a Royal Navy ship

== See also ==
- GNU Fortran, a fork of the G95 compiler
