= GUPS =

GUPS can refer to:

- Giga-updates per second, a measure of computer performance
- General Union of Palestinian Students
