= PERCS =

IBM PERCS
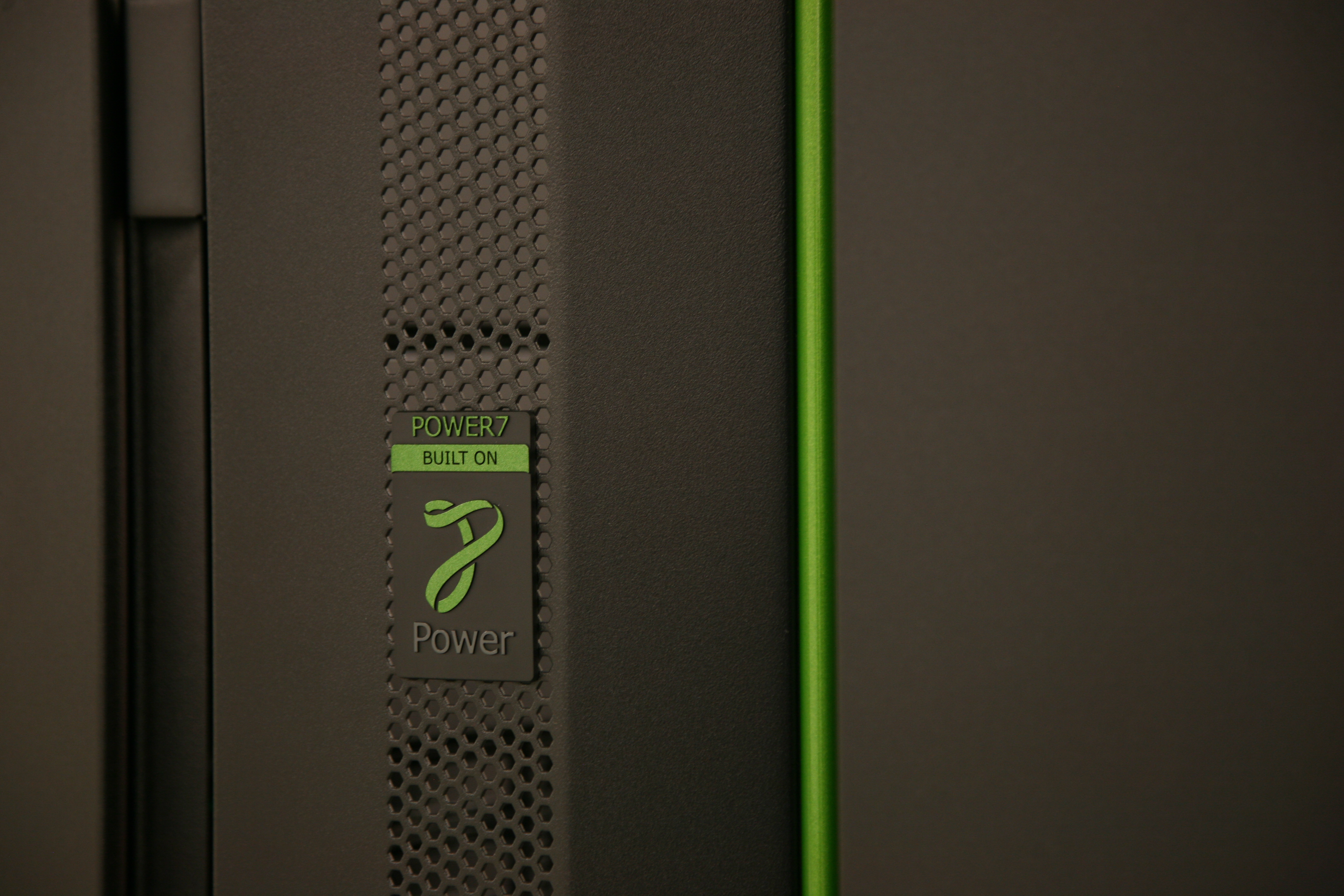
- Developer: IBM
- Type: Supercomputer platform
- Released: 2010 (as prototype); 2011 (as platform)
- CPU: IBM POWER7
- Predecessor: IBM Blue Gene; Aquasar prototype

PERCS (Productive, Easy-to-use, Reliable Computing System) is IBM's answer to DARPA's High Productivity Computing Systems (HPCS) initiative. The program resulted in commercial development and deployment of the Power 775, a supercomputer design with extremely high performance ratios in fabric and memory bandwidth, as well as very high performance density and power efficiency.

IBM officially announced the Power 775 on July 12, 2011 and started to ship systems in August 2011.

== Background ==
The HPCS program was a three phase research and development effort. IBM was one of three companies, along with Cray and Sun Microsystems, that received the HPCS grant for Phase II. In this phase, IBM collaborated with a consortium of 12 universities and the Los Alamos National Lab to pursue an adaptable computing system with the goal of commercial viability of new chip technology, new computer architecture, operating systems, compiler and programming environments.

IBM was chosen for Phase III in November 2006, and granted $244 million in funds for continuing development of PERCS technology and delivering prototype systems by 2010.

== Deployment ==
The first supercomputer using PERCS technology was intended to be the Blue Waters system, however the high costs and complexity of the system resulted in its contract being canceled. The machine was subsequently delivered by Cray Inc, using a combination of GPUs and CPUs for processing, and a network with reduced global bandwidth capabilities.

Power775 / PERCS systems were subsequently deployed at roughly two dozen institutions in the U.S. and other countries, in installations ranging from 2,000 to over 64,000 Power7 processing cores. Major deployments have been for network-intensive and memory-intensive applications (as opposed to FLOPS-intensive), such as weather & climate modeling (ECMWF, UKMO, Environment Canada, Japan Meteorological Agency), and scientific research (University of Warsaw, Slovak Academy of Sciences, and several other government laboratories in the U.S., and other countries).

== Technology ==
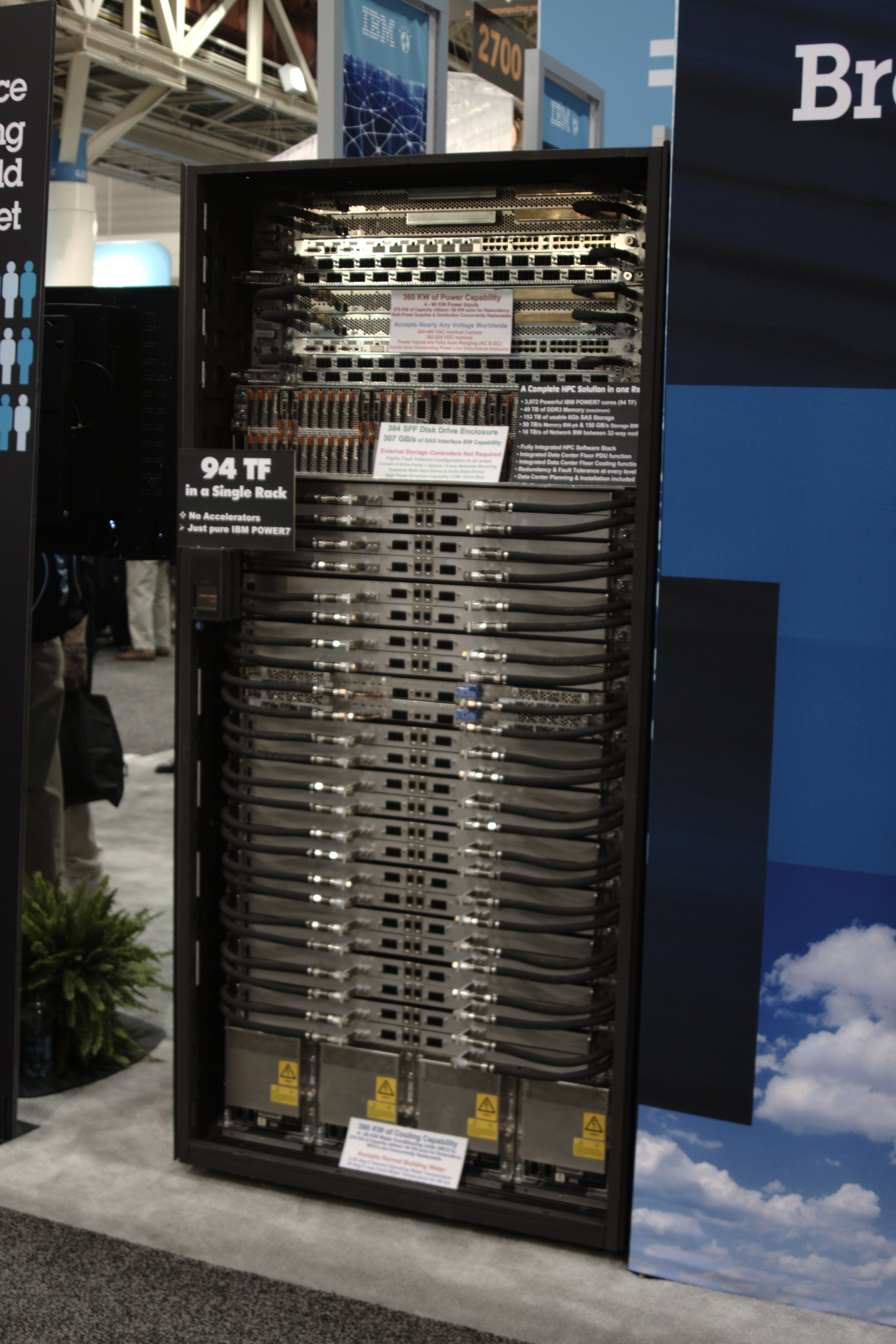
Opened PERCS rack with liquid cooling and 12 Power 775 modules (Blue Waters, circa 2010)

PERCS will use IBM's large-scale technologies from servers and supercomputers like the POWER7 microprocessor, AIX operating system, X10 programming language and General Parallel File System.

=== Power 775 ===
Sometimes known as the POWER7-IH or P7-IH, the Power 775 is the commercial product that was developed by PERCS as a part of IBM Power Systems line. The Power 775 was released by IBM in 2011 as a commercial product after IBM ended its participation in the Blue Waters petaflops project at the University of Illinois, but marketed the 775 based on the growth of its high-performance computing business.

Unlike the IBM Blue Gene series, which uses low-power processors to avoid heat-density issues, the Power 775 was a water-cooled rack-module system, and each module was 34 inches wide, 54 inches deep and 3.5 inches high (2U).

Each drawer comprises 8 cache coherent nodes (each of which can host single one or more O/S images) with a MCM with four POWER7 CPUs each, and 16 DDR3 SDRAM slots per MCM for a total of 256 POWER7 cores and 2 TB RAM. Each drawer has 8 optical connect controller hub chips, connecting neighboring MCMs, PCIe peripherals and other compute nodes in a dragonfly network topology. One rack can house up to a dozen Power 775 drawers for a total performance of 96 TFLOPS.

The system supports up to 24 terabytes of memory and 230 terabytes of storage per rack. It is estimated to achieve over 94 teraflops per rack.

== See also ==
- High Productivity Computing Systems
- DARPA
- IBM Watson - built on a similar (Power 750) air-cooled platform
