= POWER7 =

2010 family of multi-core microprocessors by IBM

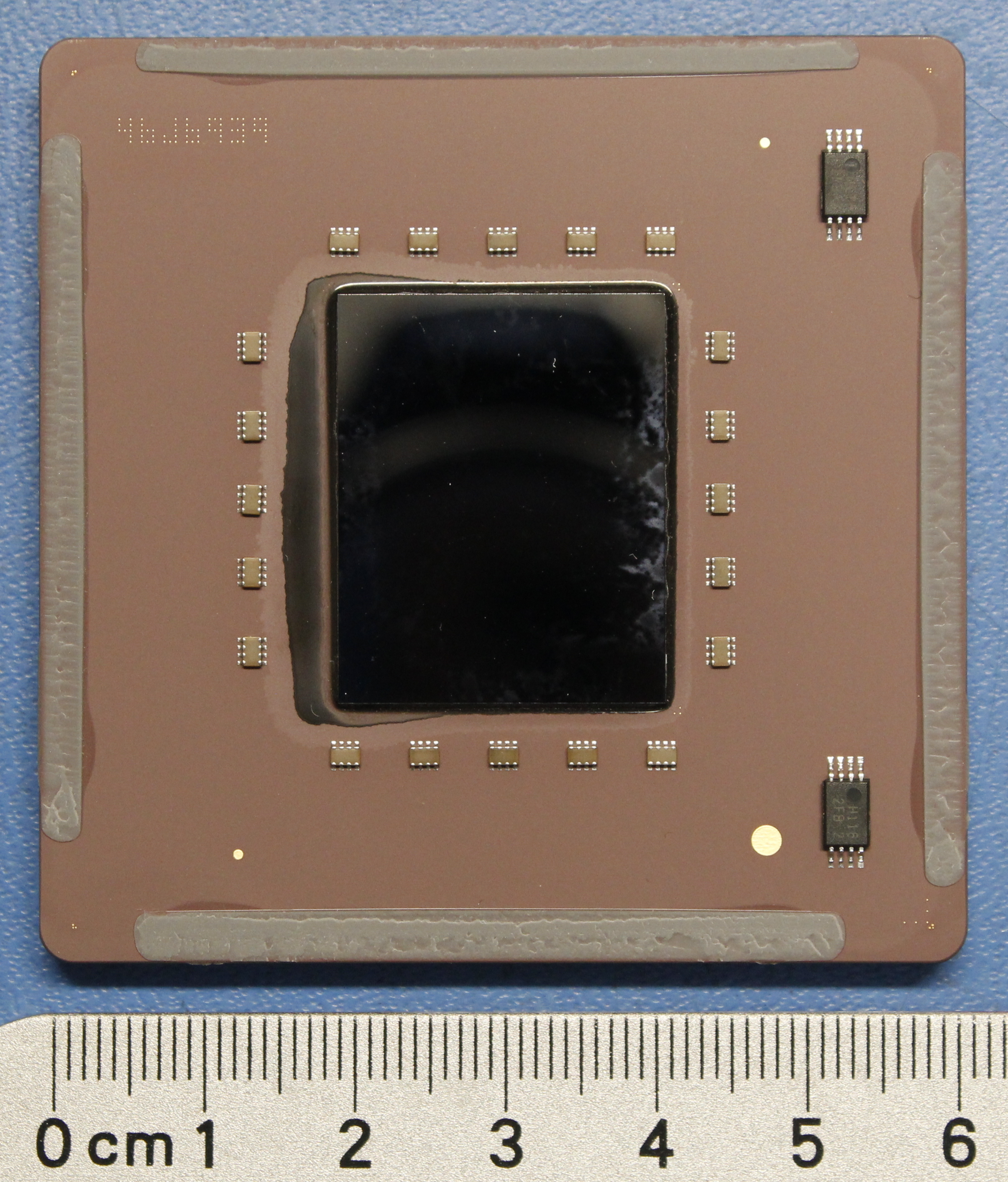
- IBM Power7 4 GHz 8-way CPU (de-lidded) from an IBM 9119

General information
- Launched: 2010
- Designed by: IBM

Performance
- Max. CPU clock rate: 2.4 GHz to 4.25 GHz

Physical specifications
- Cores: 4, 6, 8

Cache
- L1 cache: 32+32 KB/core
- L2 cache: 256 KB/core
- L3 cache: 4 MB/core

Architecture and classification
- Technology node: 45 nm
- Instruction set: Power ISA (Power ISA v.2.06)

History
- Predecessor: POWER6
- Successor: POWER8

POWER7 is a family of superscalar multi-core microprocessors based on the Power ISA 2.06 instruction set architecture released in 2010 that succeeded the POWER6 and POWER6+. POWER7 was developed by IBM at several sites including IBM's Rochester, MN; Austin, TX; Essex Junction, VT; T. J. Watson Research Center, NY; Bromont, QC and IBM Deutschland Research & Development GmbH, Böblingen, Germany laboratories. IBM announced servers based on POWER7 on 8 February 2010.

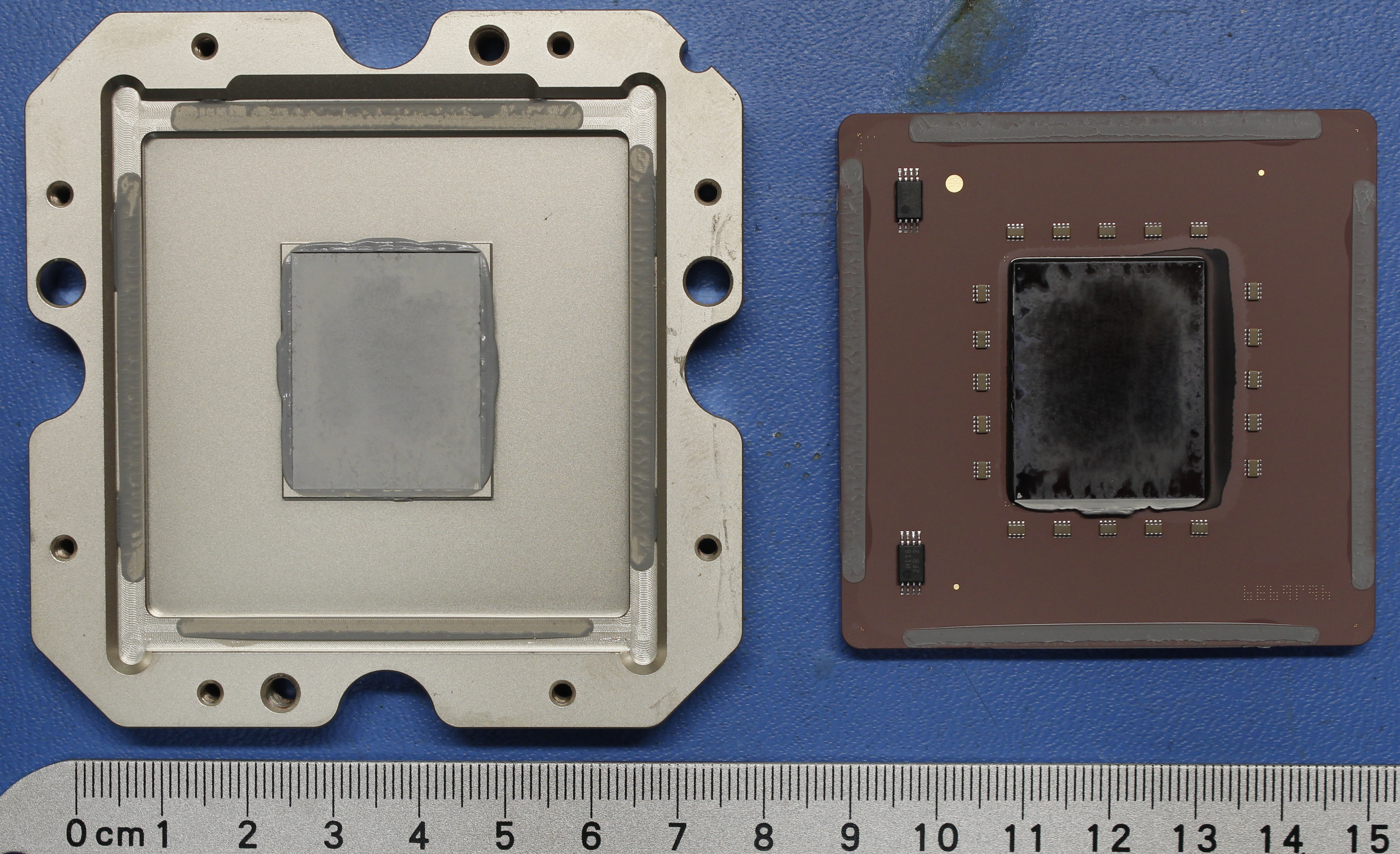
IBM Power7 4 GHz 8-way CPU and IHS from an IBM 9119

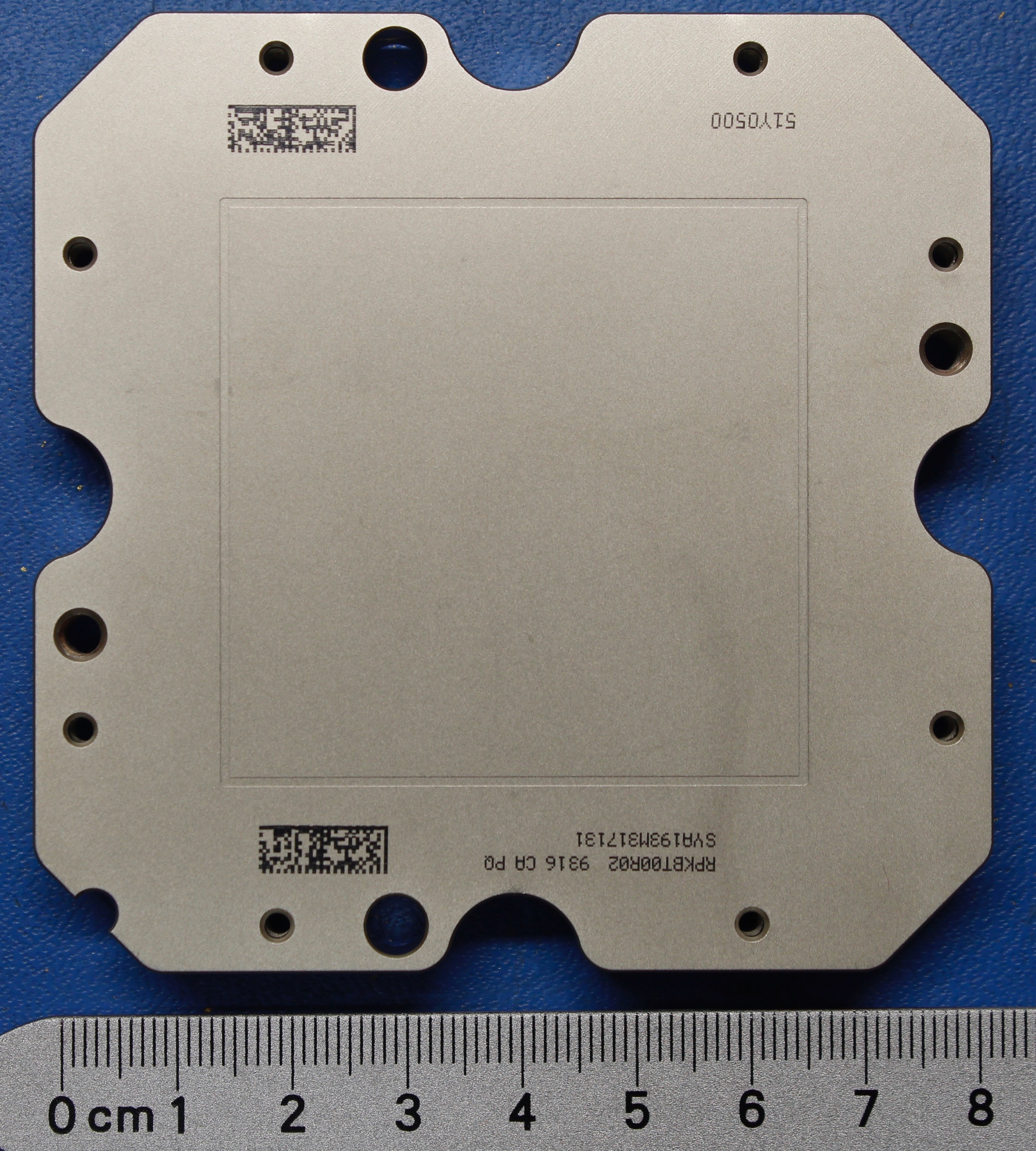
IBM Power7 4 GHz 8-way CPU IHS top from an IBM 9119

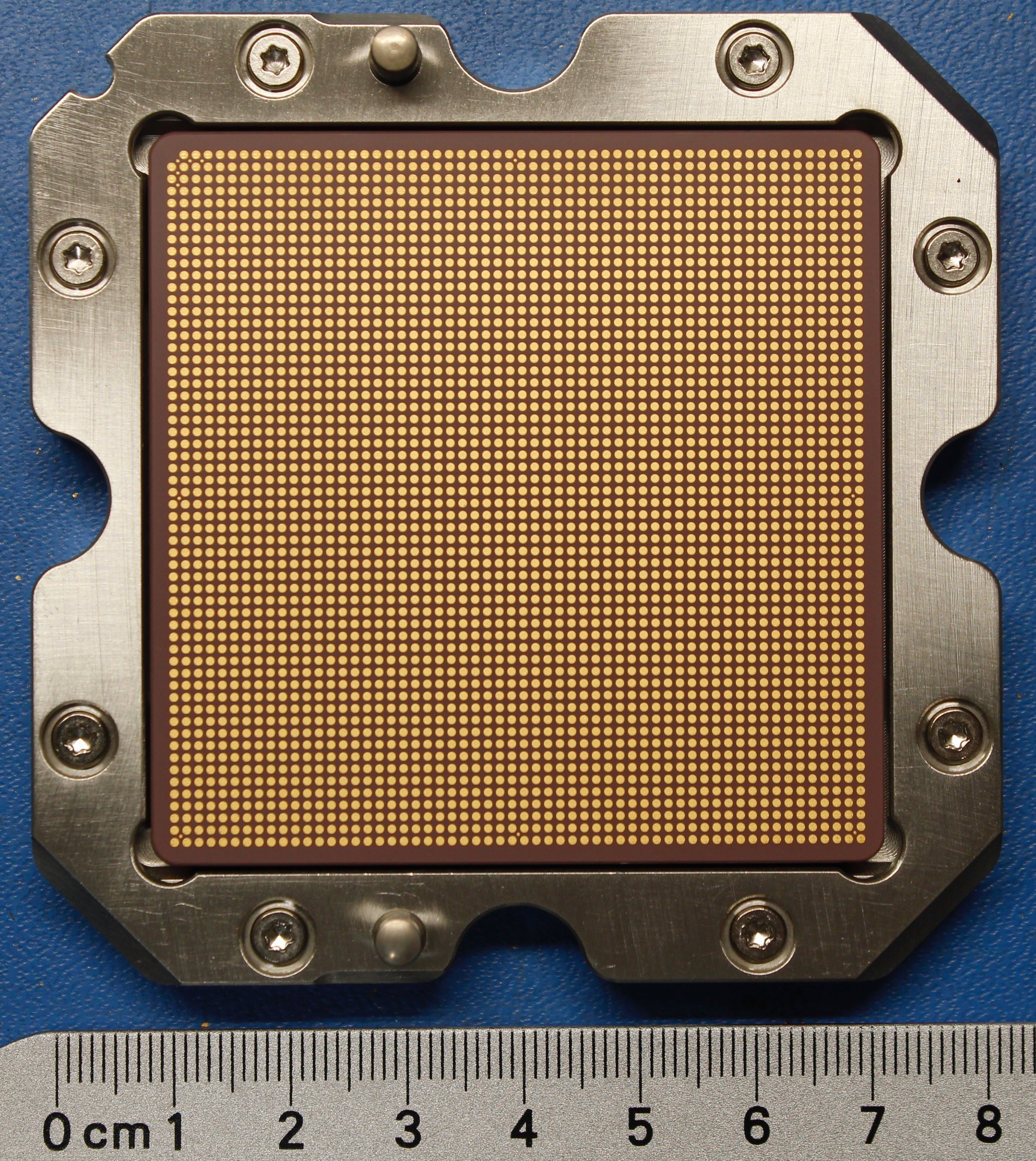
IBM Power7 4 GHz 8-way CPU bottom from an IBM 9119

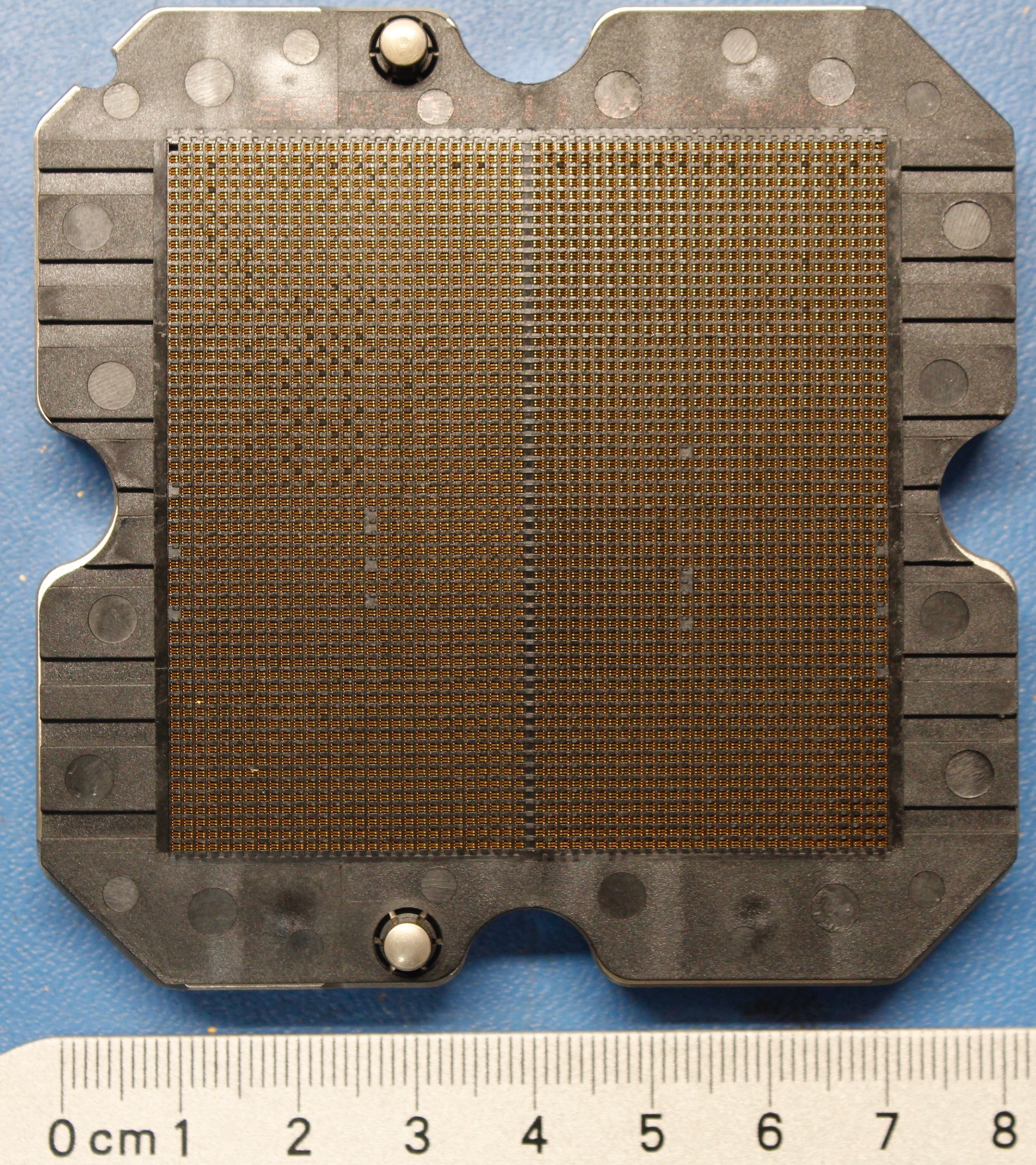
IBM Power7 4 GHz 8-way CPU removable interposer from an IBM 9119

== History ==
IBM won a $244 million DARPA contract in November 2006 to develop a petascale supercomputer architecture before the end of 2010 in the HPCS project. The contract also states that the architecture shall be available commercially. IBM's proposal, PERCS (Productive, Easy-to-use, Reliable Computer System), which won them the contract, is based on the POWER7 processor, AIX operating system and General Parallel File System.

One feature that IBM and DARPA collaborated on is modifying the addressing and page table hardware to support global shared memory space for POWER7 clusters. This allows research scientists to program a cluster as if it were a single system, without using message passing. From a productivity standpoint, this is essential since some scientists are not conversant with MPI or other parallel programming techniques used in clusters.

== Design ==
The POWER7 superscalar multi-core architecture was a substantial evolution from the POWER6 design, focusing more on power efficiency through multiple cores and simultaneous multithreading (SMT). The POWER6 architecture was built from the ground up to maximize processor frequency at the cost of power efficiency. It achieved a remarkable 5 GHz. While the POWER6 features a dual-core processor, each capable of two-way SMT, the IBM POWER 7 processor has up to eight cores, and four threads per core, for a total capacity of 32 simultaneous threads.

IBM stated at ISCA 29 that peak performance was achieved by high frequency designs with 10–20 FO4 delays per pipeline stage at the cost of power efficiency. However, the POWER6 binary floating-point unit achieves a "6-cycle, 13-FO4 pipeline". Therefore, the pipeline for the POWER7 CPU has been changed again, just as it was for the POWER5 and POWER6 designs. In some respects, this rework is similar to Intel's turn in 2005 that left the P4 7th-generation x86 microarchitecture.

== Specifications ==
The POWER7 is available with 4, 6, or 8 physical cores per microchip, in a 1 to 32-way design, with up to 1024 SMTs and a slightly different microarchitecture and interfaces for supporting extended/Sub-Specifications in reference to the Power ISA and/or different system architectures. For example, in the Supercomputing (HPC) System Power 775 it is packaged as a 32-way quad-chip-module (QCM) with 256 physical cores and 1024 SMTs. There is also a special TurboCore mode that can turn off half of the cores from an eight-core processor, but those 4 cores have access to all the memory controllers and L3 cache at increased clock speeds. This makes each core's performance higher which is important for workloads which require the fastest sequential performance at the cost of reduced parallel performance. TurboCore mode can reduce "software costs in half for those applications that are licensed per core, while increasing per core performance from that software." The new IBM Power 780 scalable, high-end servers featuring the new TurboCore workload optimizing mode and delivering up to double performance per core of POWER6 based systems.

Each core is capable of four-way SMT. The POWER7 has approximately 1.2 billion transistors and is 567 mm^{2} large fabricated on a 45 nm process. A notable difference from POWER6 is that the POWER7 executes instructions out-of-order instead of in-order. Despite the decrease in maximum frequency compared to POWER6 (4.25 GHz vs 5.0 GHz), each core has higher performance than the POWER6, while each processor has up to 4 times the number of cores.

POWER7 has these specifications:

- 45 nm SOI process, 567 mm^{2}
- 1.2 billion transistors
- 3.0–4.25 GHz clock speed
- max 4 chips per quad-chip module
  - 4, 6 or 8 C1 cores per chip
    - 4 SMT threads per C1 core (available in AIX 6.1 TL05 (releases in April 2010) and above)
    - 12 execution units per C1 core:
      - 2 fixed-point units
      - 2 load/store units
      - 4 double-precision floating-point units
      - 1 vector unit supporting VSX
      - 1 decimal floating-point unit
      - 1 branch unit
      - 1 condition register unit
  - 32+32 KB L1 instruction and data cache (per core)
  - 256 KB L2 Cache (per C1 core)
  - 4 MB L3 cache per C1 core with maximum up to 32 MB supported. The cache is implemented in eDRAM, which does not require as many transistors per cell as a standard SRAM so it allows for a larger cache while using the same area as SRAM.

The technical specification further specifies:

Each POWER7 processor core implements aggressive out-of-order (OoO) instruction execution to drive high efficiency in the use of available execution paths. The POWER7 processor has an Instruction Sequence Unit that is capable of dispatching up to six instructions per cycle to a set of queues. Up to eight instructions per cycle can be issued to the Instruction Execution units.

This gives the following theoretical single precision (SP) performance figures (based on a 4.14 GHz 8 core implementation):

- max 99.36 GFLOPS per core
- max 794.88 GFLOPS per chip

4 64-bit SIMD units per core, and a 128-bit SIMD VMX unit per core, can do 12 Multiply-Adds per cycle, giving 24 SP FP ops per cycle. At 4.14 GHz, that gives 4.14 billion * 24 = 99.36 SP GFLOPS, and at 8 cores, 794.88 SP GFLOPS.

Peak double precision (DP) performance is roughly half of peak SP performance.

For comparison, Intel's 2013 Haswell architecture CPUs can do 16 DP FLOPs or 32 SP FLOPs per cycle (8/16 DP/SP fused multiply-add spread across 2× 256-bit AVX2 FP vector units). At 3.4 GHz (i7-4770) this translates into 108.8 SP GFLOPS per core and 435.2 SP GFLOPS peak performance across the 4-core chip, giving roughly similar levels of performance per core, without taking into account the effects or benefits of Intel's Turbo Boost technology.

This theoretical peak performance comparison holds in practice too, with the POWER7 and the i7-4770 obtaining similar scores in the SPEC CPU2006 floating point benchmarks (single-threaded): 71.5 for POWER7 versus 74.0 for i7-4770.

Notice that the POWER7 chip significantly outperformed (2×–5×) the i7 in some benchmarks (bwaves, cactusADM, lbm) while also being significantly slower (2x-3x) in most others. This is indicative of major architectural differences between the two chips / mainboards / memory systems etc.: they were designed with different workloads in mind.

However, overall, in a very broad sense, one can say that the floating-point performance of the POWER7 is similar to that of the Haswell i7.

== POWER7+ ==
IBM introduced the POWER7+ processor at the Hot Chips 24 conference in August 2012. It is an updated version with higher speeds, more cache and integrated accelerators. It is manufactured on a 32 nm fabrication process.

The first boxes to ship with the POWER7+ processors were IBM Power 770 and 780 servers. The chips have up to 80 MB of L3 cache (10 MB/core), improved clock speeds (up to 4.4 GHz) and 20 LPARs per core.

== Products ==
As of October 2011, the range of POWER7-based systems including IBM Power Systems "Express" models (710, 720, 730, 740 and 750), Enterprise models (770, 780 and 795) and High Performance computing models (755 and 775). Enterprise models differ in having Capacity on Demand capabilities. Maximum specifications are shown in the table below.

IBM POWER7 and POWER7+ servers
Name	Number of sockets	Number of cores	CPU clock frequency
710 Express	1	6	4.2 GHz
710 Express	1	8	4.2 GHz
720 Express (8202-E4B, POWER7)	1	8	3.0 GHz
720 Express (8202-E4D, POWER7+)	1	8	3.6 GHz
730 Express	2	12	4.2 GHz
730 Express	2	16	3.6 GHz or 4.2 GHz
740 Express	2	12	4.2 GHz
740 Express	2	16	3.6 GHz or 4.2 GHz
750 Express	4	24	3.72 GHz
750 Express	4	32	3.22 GHz or 3.61 GHz
755	4	32	3.61 GHz
770	8	48	3.7 GHz
770	8	64	3.3 GHz
775 (Per Node)	32	256	3.83 GHz
780 (MaxCore mode)	8	64	3.92 GHz
780 (TurboCore mode)	8	32	4.14 GHz
780 (4 Socket Node)	16	96	3.44 GHz
795	32	192	3.72 GHz
795 (MaxCore mode)	32	256	4.0 GHz
795 (TurboCore mode)	32	128	4.25 GHz

IBM also offers 5 POWER7 based BladeCenters. Specifications are shown in the table below.

IBM POWER7 blade servers
Name	Number of cores	CPU clock frequency	Blade slots required
BladeCenter PS700	4	3.0 GHz	1
BladeCenter PS701	8	3.0 GHz	1
BladeCenter PS702	16	3.0 GHz	2
BladeCenter PS703	16	2.4 GHz	1
BladeCenter PS704	32	2.4 GHz	2

The following are supercomputer projects that use the POWER7 processor:

- PERCS
- Watson

== See also ==
- POWER6
- IBM Power microprocessors
