= Robert Drost =

American computer scientist

- Born: August 17, 1970 (age 56); New York City, United States
- Education: Stanford University
- Occupation: Computer Architect

Robert Drost is an American computer scientist. He was born in 1970 in New York City.

== Life ==
Drost joined Sun Microsystems in 1993 after obtaining a B.S. and M.S. in Electrical Engineering from Stanford University. In 2001 he earned a Ph.D. in Electrical Engineering and a Ph.D. minor in Computer Science from Stanford. As of 2011 he is a holder of over 95 patents in microelectronics.

Until 2010, Drost was Distinguished Engineer and Senior Director of Advanced Hardware at Sun Microsystems, helping to pioneer wireless connections between computer chips called proximity communication.

Since 2010, Drost has had various roles, including CEO, COO, and CFO, at Pluribus Networks, Inc., a Palo Alto–based startup that he co-founded with Sunay Tripathi and Chih-Kong Ken Yang.

== Distinctions ==
- Awarded Best Paper at Supercomputing 2008, the International Conference for High Performance Computing, Networking, Storage, and Analysis.
- Named to the MIT Technology Review TR100 as one of the top 100 innovators in the world under the age of 35.
- Wall Street Journal Gold Medal for Innovation in Computing Systems.
- Judge for the Wall Street Journal's Technology Innovation Awards since 2005.
