= Multiprogram Research Facility =

Coordinates: 35.931°N 84.312°W

The Multiprogram Research Facility (MRF, also known as Building 5300) is a facility at the Oak Ridge National Laboratory in Oak Ridge, Tennessee. It is used by the U.S. National Security Agency (NSA) to design and build supercomputers for cryptanalysis and other classified projects. It houses the classified component program of the High Productivity Computing Systems (HPCS) project sponsored by the Defense Advanced Research Projects Agency (DARPA).

== History ==
The High Productivity Computing Systems program was launched in 2004 as a multiagency project led by DARPA with the goal of increasing computing speed a thousandfold, creating a supercomputer capable of one petaflop (a quadrillion [10^{15}] floating-point operations a second). The project is sited at the Oak Ridge National Laboratory in Tennessee and is split into two tracks, one top secret and one unclassified, housed in separate facilities. The secret facility, used by the NSA, is located within Building 5300 at the laboratory and is known as the Multiprogram Research Facility.

The MRF was constructed in 2006 at a cost of $41 million. Located on the laboratory's East Campus, the building covers 214,000 square feet (19,900 m^{2}) and rises five stories high. As of 2012, it is staffed by 318 computer scientists and engineers.

While the unclassified portion of the HPCS project succeeded in designing the 1.3 petaflop Cray XT5 supercomputer in 2007, the MRF succeeded in developing an even faster machine, designed specifically for cryptanalysis and targeted against one or more specific algorithms, such as the Advanced Encryption Standard (AES). A former NSA official called the MRF's breakthrough "enormous", giving the agency the ability to break current public encryption standards. The data upon which the supercomputer operates is stored at the agency's Utah Data Center in Bluffdale, Utah.

The MRF's next goal is to achieve a machine capable of one exaflop (10^{18} floating-point operations per second) and then one zetaflop (10^{21}). To achieve an exaflop machine by 2018, the NSA has proposed constructing two connecting buildings, totaling 260,000 square feet (24,000 m^{2}), called the Multiprogram Computational Data Center. The buildings will store dozens of computer cabinets that will comprise the exaflop machine. The facility will eventually use about 200 megawatts of power—enough to power around 200,000 homes—and will require 60,000 short tons (54,000 tonnes) of cooling equipment.

== See also ==
- Exascale computing
