= Chapel (programming language) =

Parallel programming language

- Paradigm: Object-oriented; Partitioned global address space Parallel programming
- Designed by: David Callahan, Hans Zima, Brad Chamberlain, John Plevyak
- Developer: Hewlett Packard Enterprise (previously Cray Inc.)
- First appeared: 2009; 17 years ago
- Stable release: 2.6.0 / September 18, 2025; 11 months ago
- Typing discipline: Static, inferred
- Platform: Multiplatform, including Amazon Web Services, HPE Cray EX
- OS: Mac OS, Linux, POSIX, Windows (with Cygwin), NetBSD
- License: Apache License 2.0
- Filename extensions: .chpl
- Website: chapel-lang.org

Influenced by
- Ada, C#, C, Fortran, C++, Java, HPF, ZPL, Cray MTA / XMT extensions to C and Fortran.

Chapel (originally the Cascade High Productivity Language or CHPL) is a parallel programming language created by Cray as part of the Cray Cascade project, a participant in DARPA's High Productivity Computing Systems (HPCS) program. It was developed as an open source project, under version 2 of the Apache license.

The Chapel compiler is written in C and C++ (C++14). The backend (i.e. the optimizer) is LLVM, written in C++. Python 3.7 or newer is required for some optional components such as Chapel’s test system and c2chapel, a tool to generate C bindings for Chapel. By default Chapel compiles to binary executables, but it can also compile to C code. Chapel code can be compiled to libraries to be callable from C, or Fortran or e.g. Python also supported. Chapel supports GPU programming through code generation for NVIDIA and AMD graphics processing units.

== Goals ==
Chapel aims to improve the programmability of parallel computers in general and the Cascade system in particular, by providing a higher level of expression than current programming languages do and by improving the separation between algorithmic expression and data structure implementation details.

The language designers aspire for Chapel to bridge the gap between current high-performance computing (HPC) programming practitioners, who they describe as Fortran, C or C++ users writing procedural code using technologies like OpenMP and MPI on one side, and newly graduating computer programmers who tend to prefer Java, Python or Matlab with only some of them having experience with C++ or C. Chapel should offer the productivity advances offered by the latter suite of languages while not alienating the users of the first.

== Features ==
Chapel supports a multithreaded parallel programming model at a high level by supporting abstractions for data parallelism, task parallelism, and nested parallelism. It enables optimizations for the locality of data and computation in the program via abstractions for data distribution and data-driven placement of subcomputations. It allows for code reuse and generality through object-oriented concepts and generic programming features. For instance, Chapel allows for the declaration of locales.

While Chapel borrows concepts from many preceding languages, its parallel concepts are most closely based on ideas from High Performance Fortran (HPF), ZPL, and the Cray MTA's extensions to Fortran and C.

== See also ==
- Coarray Fortran
- Fortress
- Unified Parallel C
- X10
- RaftLib
