= LAM/MPI =

LAM/MPI is one of the predecessors of the Open MPI project. Open MPI represents a community-driven, next generation implementation of a Message Passing Interface (MPI) fundamentally designed upon a component architecture to make an extremely powerful platform for high-performance computing. LAM/MPI was officially retired in March 2015.

LAM (Local Area Multicomputer) is an MPI programming environment and development system for heterogeneous computers on a network. With LAM/MPI, a dedicated computer cluster or an existing network computing infrastructure can act as a single parallel computing resource. LAM/MPI is considered to be "cluster friendly", in that it offers daemon-based process startup/control as well as fast client-to-client message passing protocols. LAM/MPI can use TCP/IP, shared memory, Myrinet (GM), or Infiniband (mVAPI) for message passing.

LAM features a full implementation of MPI-1 and much of MPI-2. Compliant applications are source code portable between LAM/MPI and any other implementation of MPI. In addition to providing a high-quality implementation of the MPI standard, LAM/MPI offers extensive monitoring capabilities to support debugging. Monitoring happens on two levels. First, LAM/MPI has the hooks to allow a snapshot of process and message status to be taken at any time during an application run. This snapshot includes all aspects of synchronization plus datatype maps/signatures, communicator group membership, and message contents (see the XMPI application on the main LAM web site). On the second level, the MPI library is instrumented to produce a cumulative record of communication, which can be visualized either at runtime or post-mortem.
