= Utah Data Center =

NSA data storage facility

Coordinates: 40.427°N 111.934°W

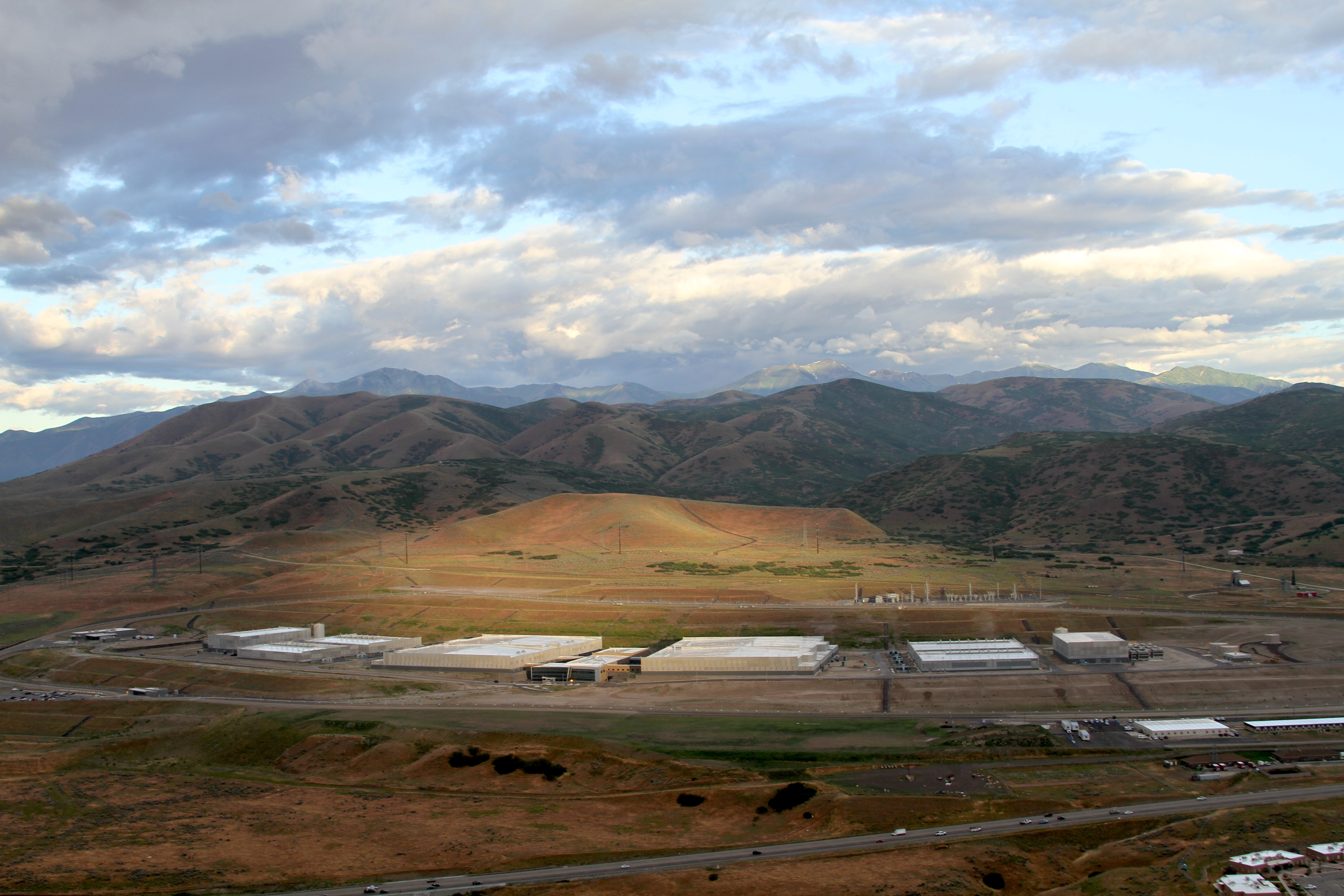
NSA's Utah Data Center

The Utah Data Center (UDC), also known as the Intelligence Community Comprehensive National Cybersecurity Initiative Data Center, is a data storage facility for the United States Intelligence Community that is designed to store data estimated to be on the order of exabytes or larger. Its purpose is to support the Comprehensive National Cybersecurity Initiative (CNCI), though its precise mission is classified. The National Security Agency (NSA) leads operations at the facility as the executive agent for the Director of National Intelligence. It is located at Camp Williams near Bluffdale, Utah, between Utah Lake and Great Salt Lake and was completed in May 2014 at a cost of $1.5 billion.

== Purpose ==
Critics believe that the data center has the capability to process "all forms of communication, including the complete contents of private emails, cell phone calls, and Internet searches, as well as all types of personal data trails—parking receipts, travel itineraries, bookstore purchases, and other digital 'pocket litter'." In response to claims that the data center would be used to illegally monitor email of U.S. citizens, in April 2013 an NSA spokesperson said, "Many unfounded allegations have been made about the planned activities of the Utah Data Center, ... one of the biggest misconceptions about NSA is that we are unlawfully listening in on, or reading emails of, U.S. citizens. This is simply not the case."

In April 2009, officials at the United States Department of Justice acknowledged that the NSA had engaged in large-scale overcollection of domestic communications in excess of the United States Foreign Intelligence Surveillance Court's authority but claimed that the acts were unintentional and had since been rectified.

In August 2012, The New York Times published short documentaries by independent filmmakers titled The Program, based on interviews with former NSA technical director and whistleblower William Binney. The project had been designed for foreign signals intelligence (SIGINT) collection, but Binney alleged that after the September 11 terrorist attacks, controls that limited unintentional collection of data pertaining to U.S. citizens were removed, prompting concerns by him and others that the actions were illegal and unconstitutional. Binney alleged that the Bluffdale facility was designed to store a broad range of domestic communications for data mining without warrants.

Documents leaked to the media in June 2013 described PRISM, a national security computer and network surveillance program operated by the NSA, as enabling in-depth surveillance on live Internet communications and stored information. Reports linked the data center to the NSA's controversial expansion of activities, which store extremely large amounts of data. Privacy and civil liberties advocates raised concerns about the unique capabilities that such a facility would give to intelligence agencies. "They park stuff in storage in the hopes that they will eventually have time to get to it," said James Lewis, a cyberexpert at the Center for Strategic and International Studies, "or that they'll find something that they need to go back and look for in the masses of data." But, he added, "most of it sits and is never looked at by anyone."

The UDC was expected to store Internet data, as well as telephone records from the controversial NSA telephone call database, MAINWAY, when it opened in 2013.

In light of the controversy over the NSA's involvement in the practice of mass surveillance in the United States, and prompted by the 2013 mass surveillance disclosures by ex-NSA contractor Edward Snowden, the Utah Data Center was hailed by The Wall Street Journal as a "symbol of the spy agency's surveillance prowess".

Binney has said that the facility was built to store recordings and other content of communications, not only for metadata.

According to an interview with Snowden, the project was initially known as the Massive Data Repository within NSA, but was renamed to Mission Data Repository due to the former sounding too "creepy".

== Structure ==
Utah Data Center area layout

The structure provides 1 to 1.5 million sq ft (93,000 to 139,000 m^{2}), with 100,000 sq ft (9,300 m^{2}) of data center space and more than 900,000 sq ft (84,000 m^{2}) of technical support and administrative space.

An article by Forbes estimates the storage capacity as between 3 and 12 exabytes as of 2013, based on analysis of unclassified blueprints, but mentions Moore's Law, meaning that advances in technology could be expected to increase the capacity by orders of magnitude in the coming years.

Toward the end of the project's construction it was plagued by electrical problems in the form of "massive power surges" that damaged equipment. This delayed its opening by a year.

The finished structure is characterized as a Tier III data center, with over a million square feet, that cost over 1.5 billion dollars to build. Of the million square feet, 100,000 square feet are dedicated to the data center. The other 900,000 square feet are utilized as technical support and administrative space.

== See also ==
- Big data
- Cyberethics
- Electronic Communications Privacy Act
- FISA Amendments Act of 2008
- Multiprogram Research Facility
- Privacy law
- Secrecy of correspondence
- Texas Cryptologic Center
- Electronic Frontier Foundation
