= Global Arrays =

Global Arrays (GA)
- Paradigm: parallel, one-sided message passing, imperative (procedural), structured
- First appeared: 1994
- Stable release: 5.8.2/November 2022
- Typing discipline: static, weak
- OS: Cross-platform
- Website: hpc.pnl.gov/globalarrays/

Global Arrays, or GA, is the library developed by scientists at Pacific Northwest National Laboratory for parallel computing. GA provides a friendly API for shared-memory programming on distributed-memory computers for multidimensional arrays. The GA library is a predecessor to the GAS (global address space) languages currently being developed for high-performance computing.

The GA toolkit has additional libraries including a Memory Allocator (MA), Aggregate Remote Memory Copy Interface (ARMCI), and functionality for out-of-core storage of arrays (ChemIO). Although GA was initially developed to run with TCGMSG, a message passing library that came before the MPI standard (Message Passing Interface), it is now fully compatible with MPI. GA includes simple matrix computations (matrix-matrix multiplication, LU solve) and works with ScaLAPACK. Sparse matrices are available but the implementation is not optimal yet.

GA was developed by Jarek Nieplocha, Robert Harrison, R. J. Littlefield, Manoj Krishnan, and Vinod Tipparaju. The ChemIO library for out-of-core storage was developed by Jarek Nieplocha, Robert Harrison and Ian Foster.

The GA library is incorporated into many quantum chemistry packages, including NWChem, MOLPRO, UTChem, MOLCAS, and TURBOMOLE. The GA library is also incorporated into sub-surface code STOMP

The GA toolkit is free software, licensed under a self-made license.

== See also ==
- Global Arrays Home Page
- Parsoft Home Page
