= MPICH =

Free open-source software

- Stable release: 5.0.2 / 28 September 2026; 23 days ago
- Written in: C99
- Operating system: Linux, macOS, others.
- Standard: Message Passing Interface
- License: MPICH license (permissive)
- Website: mpich.org
- Repository: github.com/pmodels/mpich

MPICH, formerly known as MPICH2, is a freely available, portable implementation of MPI, a standard for message-passing for distributed-memory applications used in parallel computing. MPICH is Free and open source software with some public domain components that were developed by a US governmental organisation, and is available for most flavours of Unix-like OS (including Linux and Mac OS X).

== History ==
MPICH development began in 1992, when a standard for message passing in parallel and distributed computing was still being discussed. MPICH tracked the development of the MPI standard as it evolved. This served dual purpose: to prove that the MPI standard could be implemented as defined, and that it could be done efficiently on all major platforms.

Argonne National Laboratory and Mississippi State University jointly developed early versions (MPICH1) as public domain software. The CH part of the name was derived from "Chameleon", which was a portable parallel programming library developed by William Gropp, one of the founders of MPICH.

In 2001, work began on a new code base to replace the MPICH1 code and support the MPI-2 standard. Until November 2012, this project was known as "MPICH2". As of November 2012, the MPICH2 project renamed itself to simply "MPICH". MPICH v3.0 implements the MPI-3.0 standard. MPICH v4.x implements the MPI-4.x standard.

MPICH is one of the most popular implementations of MPI. It is used as the foundation for many other MPI implementations, including IBM MPI (for Blue Gene), Intel MPI, Cray MPI, Microsoft MPI, CDAC MPI (C-MPI), Myricom MPI, OSU MVAPICH/MVAPICH2, and many others.

== MPICH derivatives ==
- Cray (MPI for all Cray platforms)
- Microsoft (MS-MPI)
- Intel (Intel MPI)
- Ohio State University (MVAPICH)
- ParTec (ParaStation MPI)
- University of British Columbia (Fine-Grain MPI (FG-MPI) which adds support for coroutines)

== Awards ==
- MPICH received an R&D 100 Award in 2005
- MPICH was awarded the 2024 ACM Software System Award. The award recognizes that MPICH has powered 30 years of progress in computational science and engineering by providing scalable, robust, and portable communication software for parallel computers.

== See also ==
- Open MPI, another popular open source MPI implementation
- MVAPICH
