= Proximity communication =

Proximity communication is a Sun microsystems technology of wireless chip-to-chip communications. Partly by Robert Drost and Ivan Sutherland. Research done as part of High Productivity Computing Systems DARPA project.

Proximity communication replaces wires by capacitive coupling, promises significant increase in communications speed between chips in an electronic system, among other benefits. Partially funded by a $50 million award from the Defense Advanced Research Projects Agency.

Comparing traditional area ball bonding, proximity communication has one order smaller scale, so it can be two orders denser (in terms of connection number/PIN) than ball bonding. This technique requires very good alignment between chips and very small gaps between transmitting (Tx) and receiving (Rx) parts (2-3 micrometers), which can be destroyed by thermal expansion, vibration, dust, etc.

Chip transmitter consists (according to presentation slide) of big 32x32 array of very small Tx micropads, 4x4 array of bigger Rx micropads (four times bigger than tx micropad), and two linear arrays of 14 X vernier and 14 Y vernier.

Proximity communication can be used with 3D packing on chips in Multi-Chip Module, allowing to connect several MCM without sockets and wires.

Speed was up to 1.35 Gbit/s/channel in tests of 16 channel systems. BER < 10^{−12}. Static power is 3.6 mW/channel, dynamic power is 3.9 pJ/bit.
