= High Productivity Computing Systems =

High Productivity Computing Systems (HPCS) is a DARPA project for developing a new generation of economically viable high productivity computing systems for national security and industry in the 2002–10 timeframe; an extenuated research specialization that's from High-Performance Computing Systems.

The HPC Challenge (High-performance computers challenge) is part of the project. An HPCS goal is to create a multi petaflop systems.

== Participants ==
- at phase I, II and III
  - IBM with PERCS (Productive, Easy-to-use, Reliable Computer System) based on POWER7 processor, X10, AIX and Linux operating systems and General Parallel File System
  - Cray with Cascade, Chapel and Lustre filesystem
- at phase I and II
  - Sun Microsystems with proximity communication and research projects of silicon photonics, object-based storage, the Fortress programming language, interval computing
  - MIT Lincoln Laboratory
- at phase I only
  - HP
  - Silicon Graphics (SGI)
  - MITRE

Also (status unknown from official site):

- Lawrence Livermore National Laboratory
- Los Alamos National Laboratory

A vivid description of this type of work was given by James Bamford in his March 15, 2012 article:

The plan was launched in 2004 as a modern-day Manhattan Project. Dubbed the High Productivity Computing Systems program, its goal was to advance computer speed a thousandfold, creating a machine that could execute a quadrillion (10^{15}) operations a second, known as a petaflop—the computer equivalent of breaking the land speed record. And as with the Manhattan Project, the venue chosen for the supercomputing program was the town of Oak Ridge in eastern Tennessee, a rural area where sharp ridges give way to low, scattered hills, and the southwestward-flowing Clinch River bends sharply to the southeast. About 25 miles from Knoxville, it is the "secret city" where uranium- 235 was extracted for the first atomic bomb. A sign near the exit read: what you see here, what you do here, what you hear here, when you leave here, let it stay here. Today, not far from where that sign stood, Oak Ridge is home to the Department of Energy's Oak Ridge National Laboratory, and it's engaged in a new secret war. But this time, instead of a bomb of almost unimaginable power, the weapon is a computer of almost unimaginable speed.

— James Bamford, The NSA Is Building the Country's Biggest Spy Center

== See also ==
- Exascale computing program
- Multiprogram Research Facility
