= G95 =

Fortran compiler

- Original author(s): Andy Vaught
- Initial release: 2000; 25 years ago
- Final release: 0.93 / October 2012; 12 years ago
- Repository: g95.cvs.sourceforge.net
- Written in: C
- Type: Compiler
- License: GNU GPLv2
- Website: g95.org

G95 is a free, portable, open-source Fortran 95 compiler. It implements the Fortran 95 standard, part of the Fortran 2003 standard, as well as some old and new extensions including features for the Fortran 2008 standard like coarray Fortran. It also supports the F programming language subset.

== History ==
G95 was primarily developed by Andy Vaught, before he moved to competing compiler vendor PathScale. The last stable version, 0.93, was released in October 2012. Development of G95 stopped in 2013, and the compiler is no longer maintained.

GNU Fortran, a part of GCC also known as gfortran, has now bypassed G95 in terms of its Fortran 2008 implementation and in the speed of the generated code. GNU Fortran was originally forked, in January 2003, from G95.
