= GNU Fortran =

Fortran compiler

- Developer: GNU Project
- Release: April 20, 2005; 21 years ago
- Stable release: 13.2 / 27 July 2023; 3 years ago
- Written in: C, C++
- Operating system: Cross-platform
- Platform: GNU
- Type: Compiler
- License: GNU General Public License (version 3 or later)
- Website: gcc.gnu.org/fortran/
- Repository: gcc.gnu.org/git/?p=gcc.git

GNU Fortran (GFortran) is an implementation of the Fortran programming language in the GNU Compiler Collection (GCC), an open-source and free software project maintained in the open-source programmer community under the umbrella of the GNU Project. It is the successor to previous compiler versions in the suite, such as g77.

== History ==
As of August 2026, GFortran had almost fully implemented Fortran 2008, about 50% of Fortran 2018, as well as initial support for Fortran 2023. It supports the OpenMP multi-platform shared memory multiprocessing, up to its latest version (4.5). Since the release 16.1 in April 2026, GFortran supports natively coarrays using native shared memory mulithreading on single node machines and handles Fortran 2018's TEAM feature.

GFortran is also compatible with most language extensions and compilation options supported by g77, and many other popular extensions of the Fortran language.

Since GCC version 4.0.0, released in April 2005, GFortran has replaced the older g77 compiler. The new Fortran front-end for GCC was rewritten from scratch, after the principal author and maintainer of g77, Craig Burley, decided in 2001 to stop working on the g77 front end. GFortran forked off from g95 in January 2003, which itself started in early 2000. The two codebases have "significantly diverged" according to GCC developers, and g95 has not been maintained since 2013. Since 2010 the front-end, like the rest of the GCC project, has been migrated to C++, where it was previously written in C. Development of the compiler by volunteer users continues and each new version of GCC incorporates better support for the latest language standards and bug fixes.

== See also ==
- Cray pointer
- Quadruple-precision floating-point format
- Simply Fortran
