= Split-C =

- Paradigm: imperative (procedural), structured, parallel
- Typing discipline: static, weak, manifest
- OS: Cross-platform: Thinking Machines CM-5, Intel Paragon, IBM SP-2, Meiko CS-2
- Website: Split-C project website

Influenced by
- C

Split-C is a parallel extension of the C programming language. The Split-C project website describes Split-C as:

a parallel extension of the C programming language that supports efficient access to a global address space on current distributed memory multiprocessors. It retains the "small language" character of C and supports careful engineering and optimization of programs by providing a simple, predictable cost model.

Development of Split-C appears to be at a standstill since 1996. Split-C is similar to Cilk.
