= Blue Waters =

Supercomputer at the University of Illinois Urbana-Champaign, United States

Coordinates: 40.095391°N 88.242043°W

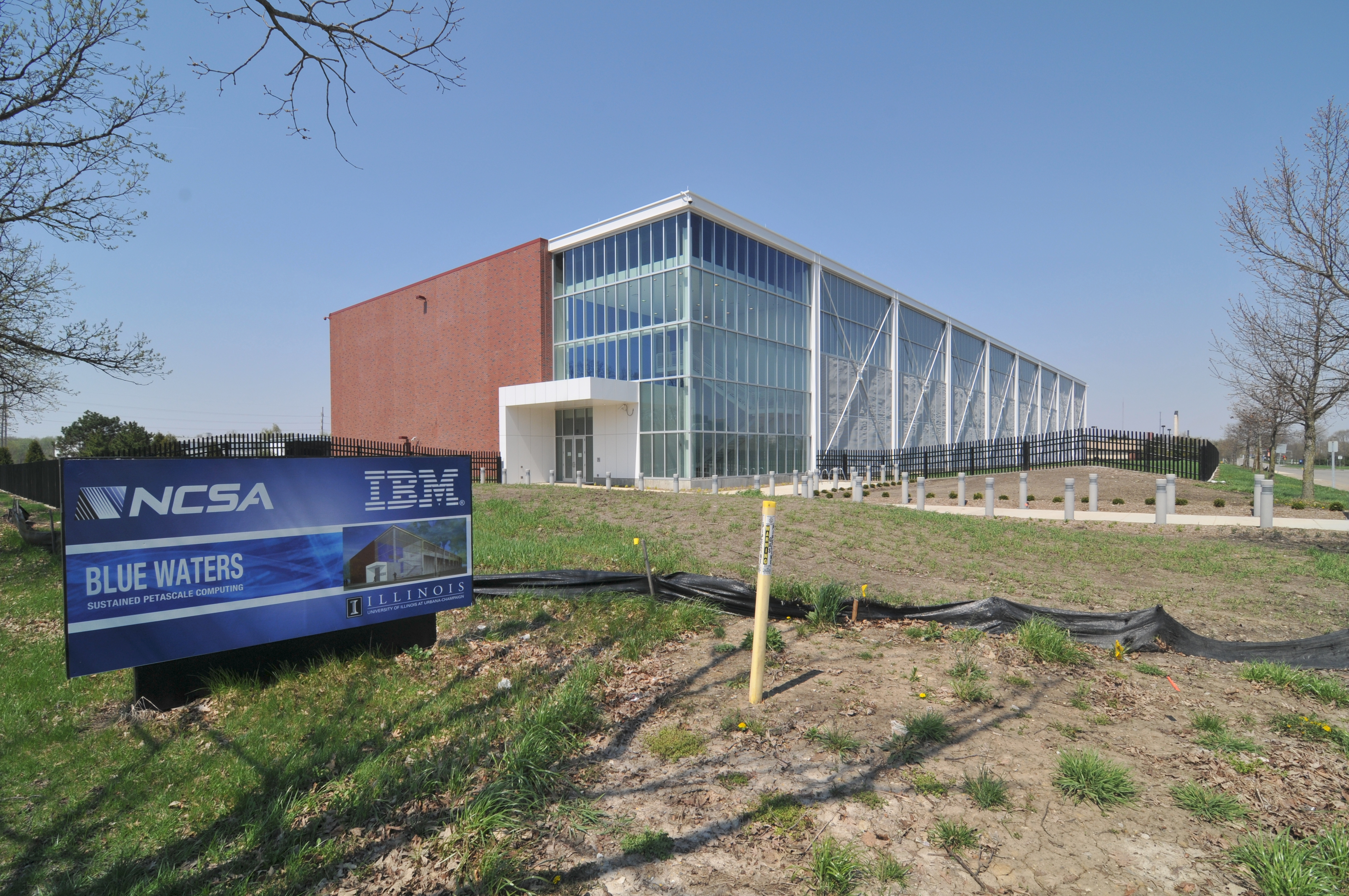
- The National Petascale Computing Facility, home of Blue Waters
- Sponsors: US NSF and University of Illinois Urbana-Champaign
- Operators: Cray Inc.
- Location: University of Illinois Urbana-Champaign
- Architecture: 49,000 AMD CPUs; 237 Cray XE6 cabinets 44 Cray XK7 cabinets
- Operating system: Cray Linux Environment
- Memory: 1.5 PB
- Storage: 26.5 PB, 1.1 TB/s Sonexion storage array
- Speed: 13.3 PetaFLOPS
- Purpose: Scientific research
- Website: bluewaters.ncsa.illinois.edu

Blue Waters was a petascale supercomputer operated by the National Center for Supercomputing Applications (NCSA) at the University of Illinois Urbana-Champaign. On August 8, 2007, the National Science Board approved a resolution which authorized the National Science Foundation to fund "the acquisition and deployment of the world's most powerful leadership-class supercomputer." The NSF awarded $208 million for the Blue Waters project.

On August 8, 2011, NCSA announced that IBM had terminated its contract to provide hardware for the project, and would refund payments to date. Cray Inc. then was awarded a $188 million contract with the University of Illinois Urbana-Champaign to build the supercomputer for the Blue Waters project; the supercomputer was installed in phases in 2012. It operated until December 31, 2021, and was replaced by the Delta project in April 2022.

== Performance ==
Blue Waters ran science and engineering codes at sustained speeds of at least one petaFLOPS. It had more than 1.5 PB of memory, more than 25 PB of disk storage, and up to 500 PB of tape storage. The storage filesystem was the Cray Lustre parallel file system, which is capable of terabyte-per-second storage bandwidth. It was connected with 300 Gbit/s wide area links.

== Facility ==
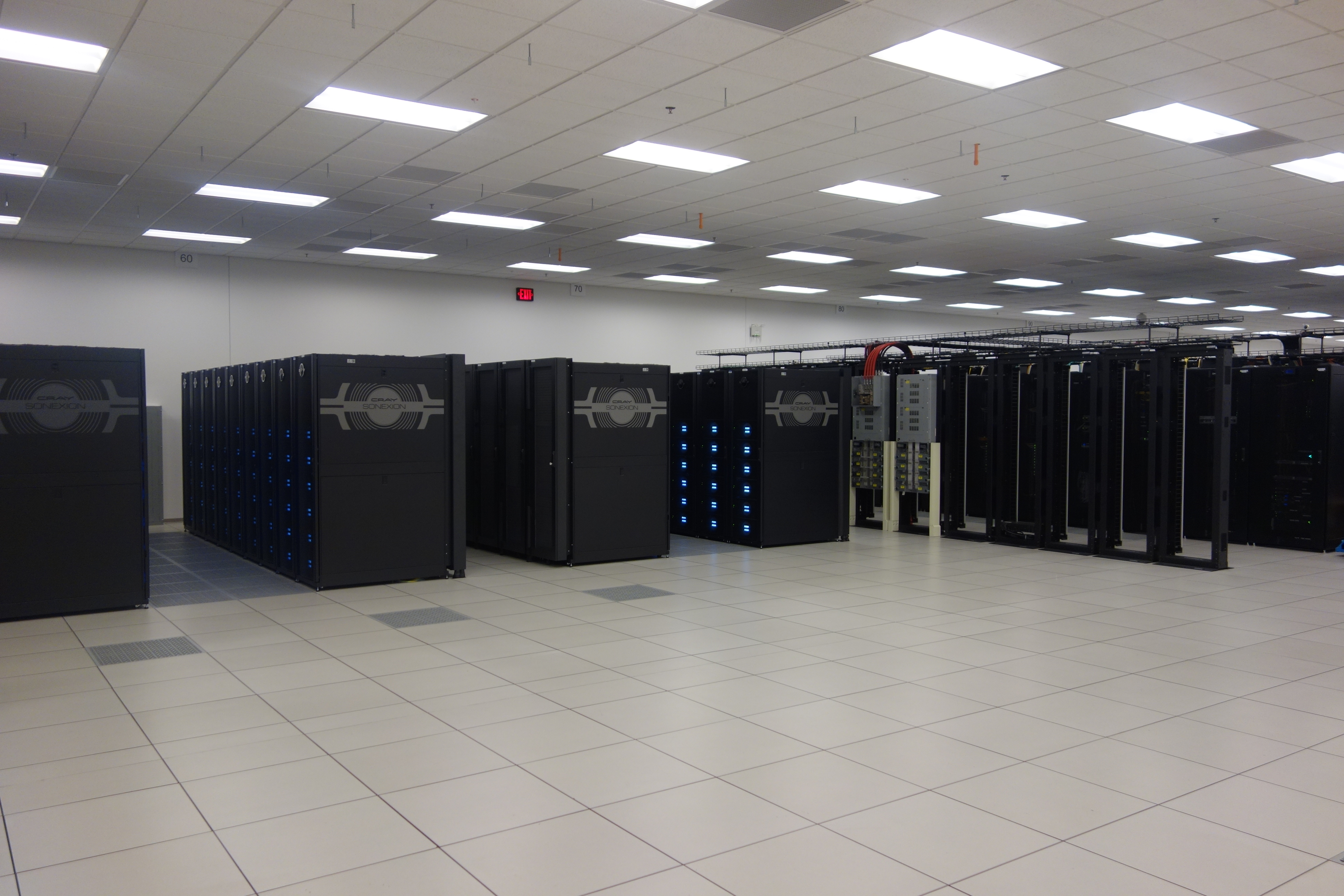
Blue Waters - Cray Sonexion storage servers

A machine the scale of Blue Waters introduces special concerns with regards to cooling and power. A new National Petascale Computing Facility was built at the University of Illinois Urbana-Champaign at the corner of Oak Street and St. Mary's Road. This facility houses Blue Waters and other NCSA computing, networking, and data systems. The 88,000-square-foot (8,200 m^{2}) building has a 20,000-square-foot (1,900 m^{2}) machine room. The facility has been certified LEED Gold. The facility makes use of the university's campus-wide water cooling system and additional on-site cooling towers that take advantage of the low temperatures in Illinois during the winter months to help reduce energy consumption. The building was designed using complex fluid dynamic models to optimize the cooling system. Energy efficiency at the data center is estimated to be in the 85–90% range, far superior to the 40% efficiency typically seen in large data centers.

== See also ==
- List of fastest computers
