= Giga-updates per second =

Measure of computer performance

Giga-updates per second (GUPS) is a measure of computer performance. GUPS is a measurement of how frequently a computer can issue updates to randomly generated RAM locations. GUPS measurements stress the latency and especially bandwidth capabilities of a machine.

The BSS Random Access benchmark was proposed by IBM Research (Bhatotia, Sabharwal and Saxena at ACM/IEEE HiPC 2010) for measuring random memory access capability (GUPS) of multicores platforms. The new benchmark overcomes some of the major limitations (such as streaming access pattern, etc.) of the HPC Challenge Random Memory Access benchmark.
