= Message Passing Interface =

Message-passing system for parallel computers

The Message Passing Interface (MPI) is a portable message-passing standard designed to function on parallel computing architectures. The MPI standard defines the syntax and semantics of library routines that are useful to a wide range of users writing portable message-passing programs in C, C++, and Fortran. There are several open-source MPI implementations, which fostered the development of a parallel software industry, and encouraged development of portable and scalable large-scale parallel applications.

== History ==
The message passing interface effort began in the summer of 1991 when a small group of researchers started discussions at a mountain retreat in Austria. Out of that discussion came a Workshop on Standards for Message Passing in a Distributed Memory Environment, held on April 29–30, 1992 in Williamsburg, Virginia. Attendees at Williamsburg discussed the basic features essential to a standard message-passing interface and established a working group to continue the standardization process. Jack Dongarra, Tony Hey, and David W. Walker put forward a preliminary draft proposal, "MPI1", in November 1992. In November 1992 a meeting of the MPI working group took place in Minneapolis and decided to place the standardization process on a more formal footing. The MPI working group met every 6 weeks throughout the first 9 months of 1993. The draft MPI standard was presented at the Supercomputing '93 conference in November 1993. After a period of public comments, which resulted in some changes in MPI, version 1.0 of MPI was released in June 1994. These meetings and the email discussion together constituted the MPI Forum, membership of which has been open to all members of the high-performance-computing community.

The MPI effort involved about 80 people from 40 organizations, mainly in the United States and Europe. Most of the major vendors of concurrent computers were involved in the MPI effort, collaborating with researchers from universities, government laboratories, and industry.

MPI provides parallel hardware vendors with a standard set of routines for implementation. As a result, hardware vendors can build upon this collection of standard low-level routines to create higher-level routines for the distributed-memory communication environment supplied with their parallel machines. The interface is structured to accommodate both basic portable usage and advanced, high-performance message passing operations.

In an effort to create a universal standard for message passing, researchers did not base it off of a single system but it incorporated the most useful features of several systems, including those designed by IBM, Intel, nCUBE, PVM, Express, P4 and PARMACS. The message-passing paradigm is attractive because of wide portability and can be used in communication for distributed-memory and shared-memory multiprocessors, networks of workstations, and a combination of these elements. The paradigm can apply in multiple settings, independent of network speed or memory architecture.

Support for MPI meetings came in part from DARPA and from the U.S. National Science Foundation (NSF) under grant ASC-9310330, NSF Science and Technology Center Cooperative agreement number CCR-8809615, and from the European Commission through Esprit Project P6643. The University of Tennessee also made financial contributions to the MPI Forum.

In subsequent years the MPI standard has evolved through multiple major and minor revisions, each introducing new capabilities and improvements. For example, MPI-3.0 introduced nonblocking collective operations, enhancements to one-sided communication, and updated language bindings; MPI-4.0 added large-count routines, persistent collectives, and refined initialization methods; and MPI-5.0 introduced a standardized application binary interface (ABI) to improve interoperability between implementations.

== Overview ==
MPI is a communication protocol for programming parallel computers. Both point-to-point and collective communication are supported. MPI "is a message-passing application programmer interface, together with protocol and semantic specifications for how its features must behave in any implementation". MPI's goals are high performance, scalability, and portability. MPI remained the dominant model used in high-performance computing as of 2006.

The standard’s goals include high performance, scalability, and portability across parallel computing architectures. Although not governed by a formal international standards body, MPI is widely regarded as a de facto standard for message passing in high-performance computing applications.

MPI is not sanctioned by any major standards body; nevertheless, it has become a de facto standard for communication among processes that model a parallel program running on a distributed memory system. Actual distributed memory supercomputers such as computer clusters often run such programs.

The principal MPI-1 model has no shared memory concept, and MPI-2 has only a limited distributed shared memory concept. Nonetheless, MPI programs are regularly run on shared-memory computers, and both MPICH and Open MPI can use shared memory for message transfer if it is available. Designing programs around the MPI model (contrary to explicit shared memory models) has advantages when running on NUMA architectures, since MPI encourages memory locality. Explicit shared-memory programming was introduced in MPI-3.

Although MPI belongs in layers 5 and higher of the OSI Reference Model, implementations may cover most layers, with sockets and Transmission Control Protocol (TCP) used in the transport layer.

Most MPI implementations consist of a specific set of routines directly callable from C, C++, Fortran (i.e., an API) and any language able to interface with such libraries, including C#, Java or Python. The advantages of MPI over older message-passing libraries are portability (because MPI has been implemented for almost every distributed-memory architecture) and speed (because each implementation is in principle optimized for the hardware on which it runs).

MPI uses Language Independent Specifications (LIS) for calls and language bindings. The first MPI standard specified ANSI C and Fortran 77 bindings together with the LIS. The draft was presented at Supercomputing 1994 (November 1994) and finalized soon thereafter. About 128 functions constitute the MPI-1.3 standard, which was released as the final end of the MPI-1 series in 2008.

At present, the standard has several versions: version 1.3 (commonly abbreviated MPI-1), which emphasizes message passing and has a static runtime environment, MPI-2.2 (MPI-2), which includes new features such as parallel I/O, dynamic process management and remote memory operations, and MPI-3.1 (MPI-3), which includes extensions to the collective operations with non-blocking versions and extensions to the one-sided operations. MPI-2's LIS specifies over 500 functions and provides language bindings for ISO C, ISO C++, and Fortran 90. Object interoperability was also added to allow easier mixed-language message-passing programming. A side-effect of standardizing MPI-2, completed in 1996, was clarifying the MPI-1 standard, creating the MPI-1.2.

MPI-2 is mostly a superset of MPI-1, although some functions have been deprecated. MPI-1.3 programs still work under MPI implementations compliant with the MPI-2 standard.

MPI-3.0 introduces significant updates to the MPI standard, including nonblocking versions of collective operations, enhancements to one-sided operations, and a Fortran 2008 binding. It removes deprecated C++ bindings and various obsolete routines and objects. Importantly, any valid MPI-2.2 program that avoids the removed elements is also valid in MPI-3.0.

MPI-3.1 is a minor update focused on corrections and clarifications, particularly for Fortran bindings. It introduces new functions for manipulating MPI_Aint values, nonblocking collective I/O routines, and methods for retrieving index values by name for MPI_T performance variables. Additionally, a general index was added. All valid MPI-3.0 programs are also valid in MPI-3.1.

MPI-4.0 is a major update that introduces large-count versions of many routines, persistent collective operations, partitioned communications, and a new MPI initialization method. It also adds application info assertions and improves error handling definitions, along with various smaller enhancements. Any valid MPI-3.1 program is compatible with MPI-4.0.

MPI-4.1 is a minor update focused on corrections and clarifications to the MPI-4.0 standard. It deprecates several routines, the MPI_HOST attribute key, and the mpif.h Fortran include file. A new routine has been added to inquire about the hardware running the MPI program. Any valid MPI-4.0 program remains valid in MPI-4.1.

MPI-5.0 is a major update that introduces an application binary interface. This allows for increased interoperability of MPI libraries from different MPI vendors, as well as increased performance in containerized environments.

MPI is often compared with Parallel Virtual Machine (PVM), which was a popular distributed environment and message-passing system developed in 1989, and which was one of the systems that motivated the need for standard parallel message passing. Threaded shared-memory programming models (such as Pthreads and OpenMP) and message-passing programming (MPI/PVM) can be considered complementary and have been used together on occasion in, for example, servers with multiple large shared-memory nodes.

== Functionality ==
The MPI interface is meant to provide essential virtual topology, synchronization, and communication functionality between a set of processes (that have been mapped to nodes/servers/computer instances) in a language-independent way, with language-specific syntax (bindings), plus a few language-specific features. MPI programs always work with processes, but programmers commonly refer to the processes as processors. Typically, for maximum performance, each CPU (or core in a multi-core machine) will be assigned just a single process. This assignment happens at runtime through the agent that starts the MPI program, normally called mpirun or mpiexec.

MPI supports both point-to-point communication, where messages are exchanged directly between pairs of processes, and collective communication, where groups of processes cooperate on operations such as broadcast and reduction. Language bindings allow MPI routines to be used from multiple programming languages, with the C and Fortran bindings being the most common.

MPI library functions include, but are not limited to, point-to-point rendezvous-type send/receive operations, choosing between a Cartesian or graph-like logical process topology, exchanging data between process pairs (send/receive operations), combining partial results of computations (gather and reduce operations), synchronizing nodes (barrier operation) as well as obtaining network-related information such as the number of processes in the computing session, current processor identity that a process is mapped to, neighboring processes accessible in a logical topology, and so on. Point-to-point operations come in synchronous, asynchronous, buffered, and ready forms, to allow both relatively stronger and weaker semantics for the synchronization aspects of a rendezvous-send. Many pending operations are possible in asynchronous mode, in most implementations.

MPI-1 and MPI-2 both enable implementations that overlap communication and computation, but practice and theory differ. MPI also specifies thread safe interfaces, which have cohesion and coupling strategies that help avoid hidden state within the interface. It is relatively easy to write multithreaded point-to-point MPI code, and some implementations support such code. Multithreaded collective communication is best accomplished with multiple copies of Communicators, as described below.

== Concepts ==
MPI provides several features. The following concepts provide context for all of those abilities and help the programmer to decide what functionality to use in their application programs. Four of MPI's eight basic concepts are unique to MPI-2.

=== Communicator ===
Communicator objects connect groups of processes in the MPI session. Each communicator gives each contained process an independent identifier and arranges its contained processes in an ordered topology. MPI also has explicit groups, but these are mainly good for organizing and reorganizing groups of processes before another communicator is made. MPI understands single group intracommunicator operations, and bilateral intercommunicator communication. In MPI-1, single group operations are most prevalent. Bilateral operations mostly appear in MPI-2 where they include collective communication and dynamic in-process management.

Communicators can be partitioned using several MPI commands. These commands include MPI_COMM_SPLIT, where each process joins one of several colored sub-communicators by declaring itself to have that color.

=== Point-to-point basics ===
A number of important MPI functions involve communication between two specific processes. A popular example is MPI_Send, which allows one specified process to send a message to a second specified process. Point-to-point operations, as these are called, are particularly useful in patterned or irregular communication, for example, a data-parallel architecture in which each processor routinely swaps regions of data with specific other processors between calculation steps, or a master–slave architecture in which the master sends new task data to a slave whenever the prior task is completed.

MPI-1 specifies mechanisms for both blocking and non-blocking point-to-point communication mechanisms, as well as the so-called 'ready-send' mechanism whereby a send request can be made only when the matching receive request has already been made.

=== Collective basics ===
Collective functions involve communication among all processes in a process group (which can mean the entire process pool or a program-defined subset). A typical function is the MPI_Bcast call (short for "broadcast"). This function takes data from one node and sends it to all processes in the process group. A reverse operation is the MPI_Reduce call, which takes data from all processes in a group, performs an operation (such as summing), and stores the results on one node. MPI_Reduce is often useful at the start or end of a large distributed calculation, where each processor operates on a part of the data and then combines it into a result.

Other operations perform more sophisticated tasks, such as MPI_Alltoall which rearranges n items of data such that the nth node gets the nth item of data from each.

=== Derived data types ===
Many MPI functions require specifing the type of data which is sent between processes. This is because MPI aims to support heterogeneous environments where types might be represented differently on the different nodes (for example they might be running different CPU architectures that have different endianness), in which case MPI implementations can perform data conversion. Since the C language does not allow a type itself to be passed as a parameter, MPI predefines the constants MPI_INT, MPI_CHAR, MPI_DOUBLE to correspond with int, char, double, etc.

Here is an example in C that passes arrays of ints from all processes to one. The one receiving process is called the "root" process, and it can be any designated process but normally it will be process 0. All the processes ask to send their arrays to the root with MPI_Gather, which is equivalent to having each process (including the root itself) call MPI_Send and the root make the corresponding number of ordered MPI_Recv calls to assemble all of these arrays into a larger one:

int send_array[100];
int root = 0; /* or whatever */
int num_procs, *recv_array;
MPI_Comm_size(comm, &num_procs);
recv_array = malloc(num_procs * sizeof(send_array));
MPI_Gather(send_array, sizeof(send_array) / sizeof(*send_array), MPI_INT,
           recv_array, sizeof(send_array) / sizeof(*send_array), MPI_INT,
           root, comm);

However, it may be instead desirable to send data as one block as opposed to 100 ints. To do this define a "contiguous block" derived data type:

MPI_Datatype newtype;
MPI_Type_contiguous(100, MPI_INT, &newtype);
MPI_Type_commit(&newtype);
MPI_Gather(array, 1, newtype, receive_array, 1, newtype, root, comm);

For passing a class or a data structure, MPI_Type_create_struct creates an MPI derived data type from MPI_predefined data types, as follows:

int MPI_Type_create_struct(int count,
                           int *blocklen,
                           MPI_Aint *disp,
                           MPI_Datatype *type,
                           MPI_Datatype *newtype)

where:

- count is a number of blocks, and specifies the length (in elements) of the arrays blocklen, disp, and type.
- blocklen contains numbers of elements in each block,
- disp contains byte displacements of each block,
- type contains types of element in each block.
- newtype (an output) contains the new derived type created by this function

The disp (displacements) array is needed for data structure alignment, since the compiler may pad the variables in a class or data structure. The safest way to find the distance between different fields is by obtaining their addresses in memory. This is done with MPI_Get_address, which is normally the same as C's & operator but that might not be true when dealing with memory segmentation.

Passing a data structure as one block is significantly faster than passing one item at a time, especially if the operation is to be repeated. This is because fixed-size blocks do not require serialization during transfer.

Given the following data structures:

struct A {
    int f;
    short p;
};

struct B {
    struct A a;
    int pp, vp;
};

Here's the C code for building an MPI-derived data type:

static const int blocklen[] = {1, 1, 1, 1};
static const MPI_Aint disp[] = {
    offsetof(struct B, a) + offsetof(struct A, f),
    offsetof(struct B, a) + offsetof(struct A, p),
    offsetof(struct B, pp),
    offsetof(struct B, vp)
};
static MPI_Datatype type[] = {MPI_INT, MPI_SHORT, MPI_INT, MPI_INT};
MPI_Datatype newtype;
MPI_Type_create_struct(sizeof(type) / sizeof(*type), blocklen, disp, type, &newtype);
MPI_Type_commit(&newtype);

== MPI-2 concepts ==
=== One-sided communication ===
MPI-2 defines three one-sided communications operations, MPI_Put, MPI_Get, and MPI_Accumulate, being a write to remote memory, a read from remote memory, and a reduction operation on the same memory across a number of tasks, respectively. Also defined are three different methods to synchronize this communication (global, pairwise, and remote locks) as the specification does not guarantee that these operations have taken place until a synchronization point.

These types of call can often be useful for algorithms in which synchronization would be inconvenient (e.g. distributed matrix multiplication), or where it is desirable for tasks to be able to balance their load while other processors are operating on data.

=== Dynamic process management ===
The key aspect is "the ability of an MPI process to participate in the creation of new MPI processes or to establish communication with MPI processes that have been started separately." The MPI-2 specification describes three main interfaces by which MPI processes can dynamically establish communications, MPI_Comm_spawn, MPI_Comm_accept/MPI_Comm_connect and MPI_Comm_join. The MPI_Comm_spawn interface allows an MPI process to spawn a number of instances of the named MPI process. The newly spawned set of MPI processes form a new MPI_COMM_WORLD intracommunicator but can communicate with the parent and the intercommunicator the function returns. MPI_Comm_spawn_multiple is an alternate interface that allows the different instances spawned to be different binaries with different arguments.

=== I/O ===
The parallel I/O feature is sometimes called MPI-IO, and refers to a set of functions designed to abstract I/O management on distributed systems to MPI, and allow files to be easily accessed in a patterned way using the existing derived datatype functionality.

The little research that has been done on this feature indicates that it may not be trivial to get high performance gains by using MPI-IO. For example, an implementation of sparse matrix-vector multiplications using the MPI I/O library shows a general behavior of minor performance gain, but these results are inconclusive. It was not until the idea of collective I/O implemented into MPI-IO that MPI-IO started to reach widespread adoption. Collective I/O substantially boosts applications' I/O bandwidth by having processes collectively transform the small and noncontiguous I/O operations into large and contiguous ones, thereby reducing the locking and disk seek overhead. Due to its vast performance benefits, MPI-IO also became the underlying I/O layer for many state-of-the-art I/O libraries, such as HDF5 and Parallel NetCDF. Its popularity also triggered research on collective I/O optimizations, such as layout-aware I/O and cross-file aggregation.

== Official implementations ==
- The initial implementation of the MPI 1.x standard was MPICH, from Argonne National Laboratory (ANL) and Mississippi State University. IBM also was an early implementor, and most early 90s supercomputer companies either commercialized MPICH, or built their own implementation. LAM/MPI from Ohio Supercomputer Center was another early open implementation. ANL has continued developing MPICH for over a decade, and now offers MPICH-4.3.0, implementing the MPI-4.1 standard.
- Open MPI (not to be confused with OpenMP) was formed by the merging FT-MPI, LA-MPI, LAM/MPI, and PACX-MPI, and is found in many TOP-500 supercomputers.

Many other efforts are derivatives of MPICH, LAM, and other works, including, but not limited to, commercial implementations from HPE, Intel, Microsoft, and NEC.

While the specifications mandate a C and Fortran interface, the language used to implement MPI is not constrained to match the language or languages it seeks to support at runtime. Most implementations combine C, C++ and assembly language, and target C, C++, and Fortran programmers. Bindings are available for many other languages, including Perl, Python, R, Ruby, Java, and CL (see #Language bindings).

The ABI of MPI implementations are roughly split between MPICH and Open MPI derivatives, so that a library from one family works as a drop-in replacement of one from the same family, but direct replacement across families is impossible. The French CEA maintains a wrapper interface to facilitate such switches.

=== Hardware ===
MPI hardware research focuses on implementing MPI directly in hardware, for example via processor-in-memory, building MPI operations into the microcircuitry of the RAM chips in each node. By implication, this approach is independent of language, operating system, and CPU, but cannot be readily updated or removed.

Another approach has been to add hardware acceleration to one or more parts of the operation, including hardware processing of MPI queues and using RDMA to directly transfer data between memory and the network interface controller without CPU or OS kernel intervention.

=== Compiler wrappers ===
mpicc (and similarly mpic++, mpif90, etc.) is a program that wraps over an existing compiler to set the necessary command-line flags when compiling code that uses MPI. Typically, it adds a few flags that enable the code to be the compiled and linked against the MPI library.

== Language bindings ==
Bindings are libraries that extend MPI support to other languages by wrapping an existing MPI implementation such as MPICH or Open MPI.

=== Common Language Infrastructure ===
The two managed Common Language Infrastructure .NET implementations are Pure Mpi.NET and MPI.NET, a research effort at Indiana University licensed under a BSD-style license. It is compatible with Mono, and can make full use of underlying low-latency MPI network fabrics.

=== Java ===
Although Java does not have an official MPI binding, several groups attempt to bridge the two, with different degrees of success and compatibility. One of the first attempts was Bryan Carpenter's mpiJava, essentially a set of Java Native Interface (JNI) wrappers to a local C MPI library, resulting in a hybrid implementation with limited portability, which also has to be compiled against the specific MPI library being used.

However, this original project also defined the mpiJava API (a de facto MPI API for Java that closely followed the equivalent C++ bindings) which other subsequent Java MPI projects adopted. One less-used API is MPJ API, which was designed to be more object-oriented and closer to Sun Microsystems' coding conventions. Beyond the API, Java MPI libraries can be either dependent on a local MPI library, or implement the message passing functions in Java, while some like P2P-MPI also provide peer-to-peer functionality and allow mixed-platform operation.

Some of the most challenging parts of Java/MPI arise from Java characteristics such as the lack of explicit pointers and the linear memory address space for its objects, which make transferring multidimensional arrays and complex objects inefficient. Workarounds usually involve transferring one line at a time and/or performing explicit de-serialization and casting at both the sending and receiving ends, simulating C or Fortran-like arrays by the use of a one-dimensional array, and pointers to primitive types by the use of single-element arrays, thus resulting in programming styles quite far from Java conventions.

Another Java message passing system is MPJ Express. Recent versions can be executed in cluster and multicore configurations. In the cluster configuration, it can execute parallel Java applications on clusters and clouds. Here Java sockets or specialized I/O interconnects like Myrinet can support messaging between MPJ Express processes. It can also utilize native C implementation of MPI using its native device. In the multicore configuration, a parallel Java application is executed on multicore processors. In this mode, MPJ Express processes are represented by Java threads.

=== Julia ===
There is a Julia language wrapper for MPI.

=== MATLAB ===
There are a few academic implementations of MPI using MATLAB. MATLAB has its own parallel extension library implemented using MPI and PVM.

=== OCaml ===
The OCamlMPI Module implements a large subset of MPI functions and is in active use in scientific computing. An 11,000-line OCaml program was "MPI-ified" using the module, with an additional 500 lines of code and slight restructuring and ran with excellent results on up to 170 nodes in a supercomputer.

=== PARI/GP ===
PARI/GP can be built to use MPI as its multi-thread engine, allowing to run parallel PARI and GP programs on MPI clusters unmodified.

=== Python ===
Actively maintained MPI wrappers for Python include: mpi4py, numba-mpi and numba-jax.

Discontinued developments include: pyMPI, pypar, MYMPI and the MPI submodule in ScientificPython.

=== R ===
R bindings of MPI include Rmpi and pbdMPI, where Rmpi focuses on manager-workers parallelism while pbdMPI focuses on SPMD parallelism. Both implementations fully support Open MPI or MPICH2.

== Example program ==
Here is a "Hello, World!" program in MPI written in C. In this example, we send a "hello" message to each processor, manipulate it trivially, return the results to the main process, and print the messages.

/*
  "Hello World" MPI Test Program
*/
#include <assert.h>
#include <stdio.h>
#include <string.h>
#include <mpi.h>

int main(int argc, char **argv)
{
    char buf[256];
    int my_rank, num_procs;

    /* Initialize the infrastructure necessary for communication */
    MPI_Init(&argc, &argv);

    /* Identify this process */
    MPI_Comm_rank(MPI_COMM_WORLD, &my_rank);

    /* Find out how many total processes are active */
    MPI_Comm_size(MPI_COMM_WORLD, &num_procs);

    /* Until this point, all programs have been doing exactly the same.
       Here, we check the rank to distinguish the roles of the programs */
    if (my_rank == 0) {
        int other_rank;
        printf("We have %i processes.\n", num_procs);

        /* Send messages to all other processes */
        for (other_rank = 1; other_rank < num_procs; other_rank++)
        {
            sprintf(buf, "Hello %i!", other_rank);
            MPI_Send(buf, 256, MPI_CHAR, other_rank,
                     0, MPI_COMM_WORLD);
        }

        /* Receive messages from all other processes */
        for (other_rank = 1; other_rank < num_procs; other_rank++)
        {
            MPI_Recv(buf, 256, MPI_CHAR, other_rank,
                     0, MPI_COMM_WORLD, MPI_STATUS_IGNORE);
            printf("%s\n", buf);
        }

    } else {

        /* Receive message from process #0 */
        MPI_Recv(buf, 256, MPI_CHAR, 0,
                 0, MPI_COMM_WORLD, MPI_STATUS_IGNORE);
        assert(memcmp(buf, "Hello ", 6) == 0);

        /* Send message to process #0 */
        sprintf(buf, "Process %i reporting for duty.", my_rank);
        MPI_Send(buf, 256, MPI_CHAR, 0,
                 0, MPI_COMM_WORLD);

    }

    /* Tear down the communication infrastructure */
    MPI_Finalize();
    return 0;
}

When run with 4 processes, it should produce the following output:

$ mpicc example.c && mpiexec -n 4 ./a.out
We have 4 processes.
Process 1 reporting for duty.
Process 2 reporting for duty.
Process 3 reporting for duty.

Here, mpiexec is a command used to execute the example program with 4 processes, each of which is an independent instance of the program at run time and assigned ranks (i.e. numeric IDs) 0, 1, 2, and 3. The name mpiexec is recommended by the MPI standard, although some implementations provide a similar command under the name mpirun. The MPI_COMM_WORLD is the communicator that consists of all the processes.

A single program, multiple data (SPMD) programming model is thereby facilitated, but not required; many MPI implementations allow multiple, different, executables to be started in the same MPI job. Each process has its own rank, the total number of processes in the world, and the ability to communicate between them either with point-to-point (send/receive) communication, or by collective communication among the group. It is enough for MPI to provide an SPMD-style program with MPI_COMM_WORLD, its own rank, and the size of the world to allow algorithms to decide what to do. In more realistic situations, I/O is more carefully managed than in this example. MPI does not stipulate how standard I/O (stdin, stdout, stderr) should work on a given system. It generally works as expected on the rank-0 process, and some implementations also capture and funnel the output from other processes.

MPI uses the notion of process rather than processor. Program copies are mapped to processors by the MPI runtime. In that sense, the parallel machine can map to one physical processor, or to N processors, where N is the number of available processors, or even something in between. For maximum parallel speedup, more physical processors are used. This example adjusts its behavior to the size of the world N, so it also seeks to scale to the runtime configuration without compilation for each size variation, although runtime decisions might vary depending on that absolute amount of concurrency available.

== MPI-2 adoption ==
Adoption of MPI-1.2 has been universal, particularly in cluster computing, but acceptance of MPI-2.1 has been more limited. Issues include:

1. MPI-2 implementations include I/O and dynamic process management, and the size of the middleware is substantially larger. Most sites that use batch scheduling systems cannot support dynamic process management. MPI-2's parallel I/O is well accepted.
2. Many MPI-1.2 programs were developed before MPI-2. Portability concerns initially slowed adoption, although wider support has lessened this.
3. Many MPI-1.2 applications use only a subset of that standard (16–25 functions) with no real need for MPI-2 functionality.

== Future ==
Some aspects of the MPI's future appear solid; others less so. The MPI Forum reconvened in 2007 to clarify some MPI-2 issues and explore developments for a possible MPI-3, which resulted in versions MPI-3.0 (September 2012) and MPI-3.1 (June 2015). The development continued with the approval of MPI-4.0 on June 9, 2021,. MPI-4.1 was approved on November 2, 2023., with MPI-5.0 being approved on June 5, 2025, bringing significant new functionality; notably the addition of a standard Application Binary Interface (ABI)..

Architectures are changing, with greater internal concurrency (multi-core), better fine-grained concurrency control (threading, affinity), and more levels of memory hierarchy. Multithreaded programs can take advantage of these developments more easily than single-threaded applications. This has already yielded separate, complementary standards for symmetric multiprocessing, namely OpenMP. MPI-2 defines how standard-conforming implementations should deal with multithreaded issues, but does not require that implementations be multithreaded, or even thread-safe. MPI-3 adds the ability to use shared-memory parallelism within a node. Implementations of MPI such as Adaptive MPI, Hybrid MPI, Fine-Grained MPI, MPC and others offer extensions to the MPI standard that address different challenges in MPI.

Astrophysicist Jonathan Dursi wrote an opinion piece calling MPI obsolescent, pointing to newer technologies like the Chapel language, Unified Parallel C, Hadoop, Spark and Flink. At the same time, nearly all of the projects in the Exascale Computing Project build explicitly on MPI; MPI has been shown to scale to the largest machines as of the early 2020s and is widely considered to stay relevant for a long time to come.

== See also ==
- Actor model
- Bulk synchronous parallel
- Caltech Cosmic Cube
- Charm++
- Co-array Fortran
- Global Arrays
- Microsoft Messaging Passing Interface
- MVAPICH
- OpenHMPP
- Parallel Virtual Machine (PVM)
- Partitioned global address space
- Unified Parallel C
- X10 (programming language)

== Sources ==
- This article is based on material taken from Message Passing Interface at the Free On-line Dictionary of Computing prior to 1 November 2008 and incorporated under the "relicensing" terms of the GFDL, version 1.3 or later.
- Aoyama, Yukiya; Nakano, Jun (1999) RS/6000 SP: Practical MPI Programming, ITSO
- Foster, Ian (1995) Designing and Building Parallel Programs (Online) Addison-Wesley ISBN 0-201-57594-9, chapter 8 Message Passing Interface
- Wijesuriya, Viraj Brian (2010-12-29) Daniweb: Sample Code for Matrix Multiplication using MPI Parallel Programming Approach
- Using MPI series:
  - Gropp, William; Lusk, Ewing; Skjellum, Anthony (1994). Using MPI: portable parallel programming with the message-passing interface. Cambridge, MA, USA: MIT Press Scientific And Engineering Computation Series. ISBN 978-0-262-57104-3.
  - Gropp, William; Lusk, Ewing; Skjellum, Anthony (1999a). Using MPI, 2nd Edition: Portable Parallel Programming with the Message Passing Interface. Cambridge, MA, USA: MIT Press Scientific And Engineering Computation Series. ISBN 978-0-262-57132-6.
  - Gropp, William; Lusk, Ewing; Skjellum, Anthony (1999b). Using MPI-2: Advanced Features of the Message Passing Interface. MIT Press. ISBN 978-0-262-57133-3.
  - Gropp, William; Lusk, Ewing; Skjellum, Anthony (2014). Using MPI, 3rd edition: Portable Parallel Programming with the Message-Passing Interface. Cambridge, MA, USA: MIT Press Scientific And Engineering Computation Series. ISBN 978-0-262-52739-2.
- Gropp, William; Lusk, Ewing; Skjellum, Anthony (1996). "A High-Performance, Portable Implementation of the MPI Message Passing Interface". Parallel Computing. 22 (6): 789–828. doi:10.1016/0167-8191(96)00024-5.
- Pacheco, Peter S. (1997) Parallel Programming with MPI.Parallel Programming with MPI 500 pp. Morgan Kaufmann ISBN 1-55860-339-5.
- MPI—The Complete Reference series:
  - Snir, Marc; Otto, Steve W.; Huss-Lederman, Steven; Walker, David W.; Dongarra, Jack J. (1995) MPI: The Complete Reference. MIT Press Cambridge, MA, USA. ISBN 0-262-69215-5
  - Snir, Marc; Otto, Steve W.; Huss-Lederman, Steven; Walker, David W.; Dongarra, Jack J. (1998) MPI—The Complete Reference: Volume 1, The MPI Core. MIT Press, Cambridge, MA. ISBN 0-262-69215-5
  - Gropp, William; Huss-Lederman, Steven; Lumsdaine, Andrew; Lusk, Ewing; Nitzberg, Bill; Saphir, William; and Snir, Marc (1998) MPI—The Complete Reference: Volume 2, The MPI-2 Extensions. MIT Press, Cambridge, MA ISBN 978-0-262-57123-4
- Firuziaan, Mohammad; Nommensen, O. (2002) Parallel Processing via MPI & OpenMP, Linux Enterprise, 10/2002
- Vanneschi, Marco (1999) Parallel paradigms for scientific computing In Proceedings of the European School on Computational Chemistry (1999, Perugia, Italy), number 75 in Lecture Notes in Chemistry, pages 170–183. Springer, 2000
- Bala, Bruck, Cypher, Elustondo, A Ho, CT Ho, Kipnis, Snir (1995) ″A portable and tunable collective communication library for scalable parallel computers" in IEEE Transactions on Parallel and Distributed Systems,″ vol. 6, no. 2, pp. 154–164, Feb 1995.
