= Iftran =

IFTRAN (née Iftran) was created in 1972 by E. F. Miller at General Research Corporation, Santa Barbara, California as a mechanism to support structured programming concepts in a FORTRAN-based environment.

IFTRAN had these basic structured programming constructs: IF...ELSEIF...ENDIF, DO...ENDDO, FOR...ENDFOR, and CASEOF...CASE...ENDCASE statements that transliterated into pure-FORTRAN.

IFTRAN was bootstrapped through multiple stages from a hand-built parser that added IFTRAN language constructs one at a time. Eventually the IFTRAN preprocessor was converted entirely into IFTRAN and a pure-FORTRAN version of IFTRAN pre-processing its own code was used to transfer the tool to other computers. A pretty-printing capability provided automatically indented source program listings as an output of the IFTRAN pre-processor in addition to the pure-FORTRAN code that was sent to the underlying FORTRAN compiler.

According to the instruction manual for IFTRAN, a General Research report suggest this rationale for the use of a FORTRAN pre-processor:

"While the newer structured languages such as PASCAL are enjoying an unusual popularity, particularly in educational institutions, the workhorse language of scientists and engineers is still FORTRAN. FORTRAN can be argued for as the only truly transportable language; when going from site to site, FORTRAN is always expected to be available. Since this is not true of ALGOL, PASCAL, ADA or other structured languages, there is a good motivation for users and authors of code which may be transported to write in FORTRAN."
