= Lois Haibt =

American computer scientist

- Born: Lois B. Mitchell; 1934 (age 91–92); Chicago, Illinois
- Education: Vassar College
- Known for: Developer of FORTRAN
- Spouse: Luther Haibt
- Children: 1
- Scientific career
- Fields: Computer science
- Workplaces: IBM, Thomas J. Watson Research Center; Bell Laboratories

Lois B. Mitchell Haibt (born 1934) is an American computer scientist best known for being a member of the ten-person team at IBM that developed FORTRAN, the first successful high-level programming language. She is known as an early pioneer in computer science.

== Education and career ==
Haibt studied mathematics at Vassar College with an academic scholarship. She graduated with a bachelor's degree in 1955. While at Vassar, Haibt worked at Bell Laboratories during the summer.

Immediately after graduating from Vassar, Haibt began working at IBM. She started with an annual salary of $5,100, despite her lack of prior programming experience. This sum was almost double the amount that she would have made at Bell Laboratories. Haibt inferred that any job with such a high salary would be difficult, but fascinating. She was part of an academically diverse team of ten young people with varying academic degrees and unrelated areas of expertise, such as crystallography and cryptography. Experience with mathematics was their one common connection. Haibt was the only woman on the team.

According to Haibt, the team worked well together: "No one was worried about seeming stupid or possessive of his or her code. We were all just learning together." The FORTRAN team worked nontraditional hours so that they could have unlimited access to the IBM 704 computer at their offices in IBM headquarters at 590 Madison Avenue in Manhattan. They frequently rented rooms at the nearby Langdon Hotel on 56th Street and Fifth Avenue in order to sleep during the day and work at night.

In 1957, Haibt attended Columbia University.

Haibt is a member of the Mathematical Association of America.

== Research contributions ==
The IBM team spent almost three years creating the programming language FORTRAN, which reformed the way people communicate instructions to computers.

Haibt was in charge of section four of the FORTRAN project. She analyzed the flow of programs produced by other sections of the compiler. Her estimates of flow in high-traffic areas of the computer were obtained by calculating how often basic blocks of the program would execute. Haibt employed Monte Carlo methods (statistical analysis) for these calculations. Through this process, she also created the first syntactic analyzer of arithmetic expressions. Haibt planned and programmed the entire section. Haibt was also part of an eleven-person team to develop and release the first reference manual for FORTRAN in 1956.

== Personal life ==
Haibt was married to Luther Haibt (May 4, 1929 – December 3, 2000), a systems analyst at IBM in Thornwood, NY. The Haibts spent their adult lives in New York state. Haibt's daughter, Carolyn, attended Princeton University for her bachelor's degree and went on to receive a Ph.D. in mathematics from the Massachusetts Institute of Technology. Haibt's hobbies include interior decorating and reading.

== Legacy, Impact and Historical Significance ==
Haibt's developments and contributions to FORTRAN represent a foundational moment for the history of computing. Before FORTRAN programming needed a direct interaction with machine code, but FORTRAN introduced a whole new way for humans to communicate with computers that contained a more intuitive algebraic syntax. With this development the complexity and time needed to write programs was drastically reduced and enabled computing to be done by a broader group of people not just specialists.

FORTRAN in the beginning wanted to solve the huge pain point of inefficient and complicated process of programming in low level languages. The team and its programmers originally had to manually manage hardware instructions. This took an extremely long time to do and it was not unlikely that a team member would make an error. However, Haibt's work for program flow analysis and optimization directly helped to make FORTRAN useable and efficient. This also allowed for them to get widespread attention and adoption due to its easier programming. The Monte Carlo methods Haibt used to estimate execution frequency was very innovative and allowed the programmer to use known code paths and improve performance. Her approach laid the ground work for advancements in optimization techniques that are continuously used in modern programming today.

Additionally, Haibt developed the first syntactic analyzer for arrhythmic expressions which was another milestone in computer science. Syntax analysis is a core component of all modern programmers and interpreters use so computers are able to understand and process structured programming languages. This work Habit did allowed for languages like C, Java, and Python to be created showing that Habit and her developments have a long-lasting influence on programming.

Although her innovation and creations have been extremely successful, Haibt's work went unrecognized and unappreciated like many other women in the computing world during this time. The mid 20th century excluded women from proper recognition in STEM fields that were predominately dominated by men no matter the impact women had in innovation. Haibt was the only woman on the FORTRAN team, showing a clear imbalance in gender standards for the company.Haibt's success with FORTRAN is a perfect example of how women can contribute to foundational technology even when facing oppression and limited opportunities.

FORTRAN is still making an impact around the world today. Habit and the principles she created have influenced the design of almost every high-level programming language that has preceded it. Even though these new programing languages have been created, FORTRAN remains in use for scientific computing, engineering, and high performance computing environments.The programs ability to handle numerical calculations efficiently has contributed to its continued use around the world in fields like climate modeling, physics, and chemistry.

Haibt's career can also be seen to reflect the collaborative and exploratory nature of early computer science. The team's willingness at FORTRAN to experiment, learn as a group, and face limitations as a challenge rather than a barrier allowed the team to develop an innovative culture that has defined the tech industry today. Haibt's story underscores the extreme importance of diversity in problem solving and the need for varied perspectives so that the work environment becomes more creative in its solutions.

Recognizing her work not only provides a more accurate account of history, but also helps to encourage future generations of women to participate in STEM environments without the fear of entering a male dominated field. Her achievements allow historians and educators to address the historical under-representation of women innovators and encourage the future generations to be more inclusive.

== Works ==
- Original Paper on FORTRAN from 1957
- Casting Petri Nets into Programs, September 1983

== See also ==
- List of prominent pioneers in computer science
