= Industrial Real-Time Fortran =

Late-20th century formatting language involving the use of Fortran

Industrial Real-Time Fortran (IRTF) was developed, during the decade of 1970-1980, to augment the Fortran language with library bindings useful for process and device control, and I/O. Also included in IRTF was a set of bit-manipulation functions which were eventually incorporated into MIL_STD-1753 for Fortran-77, and later into Fortran-90.

== History ==
The IRTF standard evolved from a series of workshops held at Purdue University in the early 1970s. The Fortran committee created a proposal which was approved and published by the Instrument Society of America (ISA) as ISA Standard S61.1 (1972). The paper defined library calls for controlling the state of concurrently activated programs, process I/O, and bit manipulation. A second supplementary paper, ISA S61.2 (1973) was published a year later. This paper defined additional calls for random unformatted files, and bit manipulation.

Additional work, including work on management of parallel tasks, was performed both in the U.S. as S61.3, and in Germany as Prozess-FORTRAN. In 1980, a joint American/European proposal was published.

While IRTF held some influence in certain markets in the 1970s, by the early 1980s most process control systems were being built using microprocessor-based systems where Fortran was not available. Because of this, the IRTF bindings have fallen into disuse. Modern systems tend to use POSIX Threads instead.
