= Hidden line =

In mathematics, a hidden line is a geometric edge line that is not visible from an observer's view of a solid shape or object.

A common practice is to draw the visible edges as solid lines and the hidden lines as dotted lines, dashed lines, or thinner lines than the visible lines.

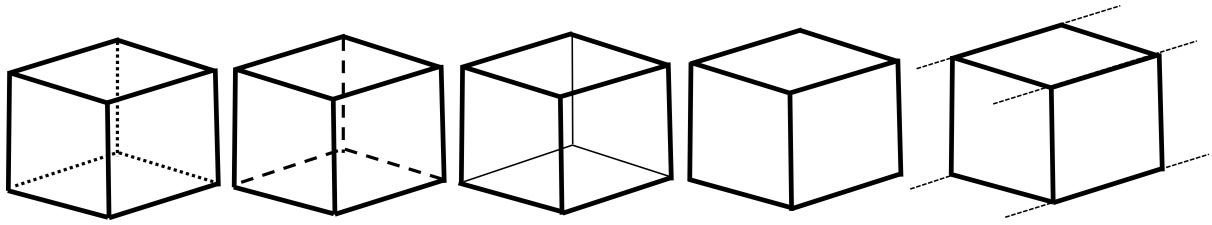
Cubes with hidden lines: dotted(1), dashed(2), thin lines(3), a cube with hidden lines removed(4), and a cube with dotted lines(5) to give three dimensional reference.

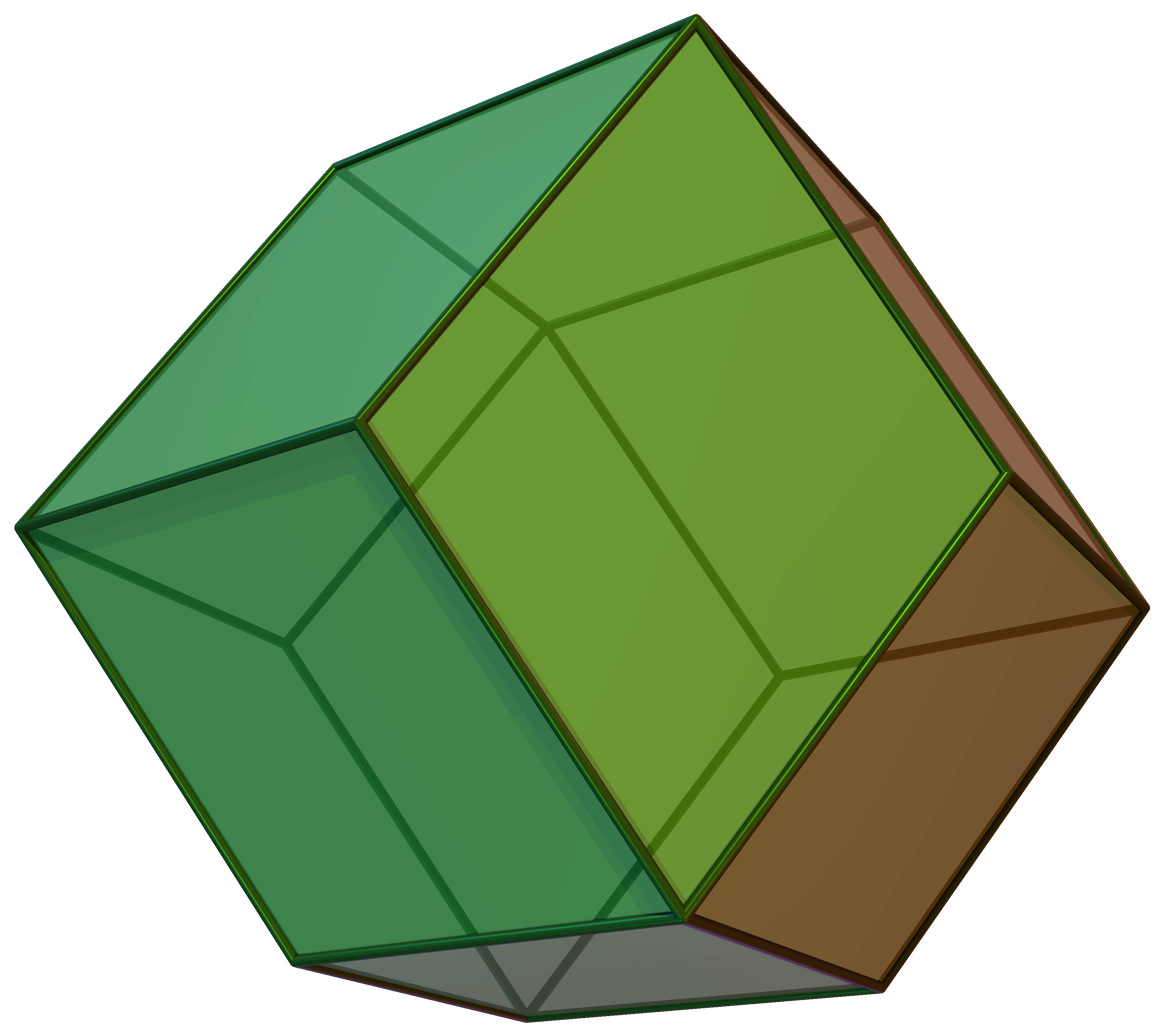
Rhombic dodecahedron, a solid with hidden lines that thinner and a lighter shade of grey.

Hidden lines add geometric information about the unseen sides of an object. They are used to help a person visualize drawings of geometric objects in three-dimensional space.

Wire-frame cube, icosahedron, and sphere

A three-dimensional object drawn with solid visible and hidden lines is a wire-frame model of the object.

== Geometry objects without hidden lines ==
When a student is first introduced to a geometric cube, it's easier to start with something they are familiar such as a common box which is a cube without hidden lines. Drawing an object without hidden lines, matches an observer's view of the object. Omitting hidden lines makes an object easier to draw.

2D Cube projection graph, in a B_{3} Coxeter plane. The cube is rotated and projected as a 3D graph. The cube without hidden lines.
2D Tesseract projection graph, in a B_{4} Coxeter plane. Tesseract 4-cube projected as a 3D graph with hidden lines as dash lines. The 4-cube without hidden lines.
2D 5 dimensional hypercube graph, in a B_{5} Coxeter plane. The 5-cube is rotated and projected into 3D with hidden lines dashed. The 5-cube without hidden lines.

To draw higher dimensional cubes, hypercubes, without hidden lines, make the faces opaque. Then, the hidden lines are no longer visible, they are removed from the observer's view. This works with n-cubes in three-dimensional space.

== Hidden lines in technical drawings ==
Hidden lines represent edges of a physical object that are not visible from a specific viewpoint. Visible lines are viewable edges from a specified viewpoint. In a technical drawing hidden lines are either included or not included, depending on the viewer’s requirement.

"Hidden lines are used in engineering drawings to represent features that cannot be seen in a particular view but are necessary to fully define the part or assembly. Hidden lines are represented by a series of short dashes, evenly spaced, with the first dash in contact with the visible line from which it starts and the last dash in contact with the visible line at which it ends."

In a computer drawing application, the hidden line option may be referred to as a wire frame with hidden edges. The wireframe hidden edges would be dashed lines.

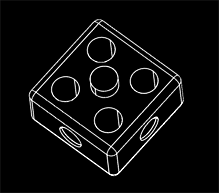
A wire-frame image with hidden-line removal, applied.

Removing hidden lines is important in computer design and graphics applications. There are algorithmic solutions to remove hidden lines or partially hidden lines during an object's rendering. "The general problem of efficiently and meaningfully displaying three-dimensional objects in two dimensions is central to computer graphics."

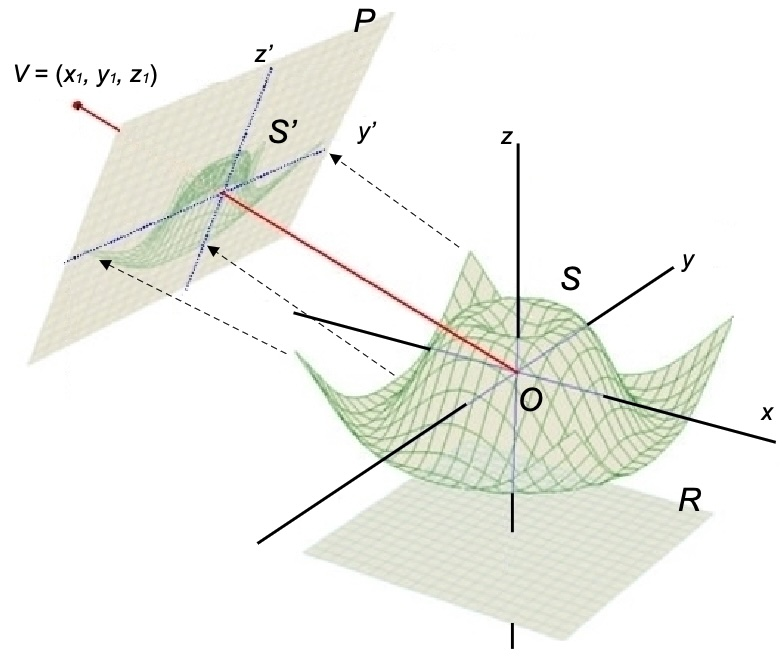
Viewer's point of view: V, viewing the 2 dimensional plane: P, which is a mapping of the 3 dimensional surface or object: S. Plane: P, is the viewer's computer screen or engineering drawing.

== See also ==
- Hidden-surface determination
- Technical drawing
- Perspective Drawing of Surfaces with Hidden Line Removal The arXiv article is written in Spanish. PDF English translation.
