= Ruth A. Weiss =

British Software engineer

- Born: March 30, 1945 (age 81); Willesden, Middlesex, England
- Citizenship: United States
- Occupation: Software engineer
- Years active: 1956 – unknown
- Known for: Pioneering work in computer graphics

Ruth A. Weiss is a British-American software engineer known for her work in computer graphics, especially the hidden-line removal problem. She also developed, together with Richard Hamming, the L2 programming language, a floating-point mathematical package for the IBM 650.

== Early life ==
Weiss was born in Willesden, Middlesex, England (now part of the Greater London area) on March 30, 1945. She arrived in the United States on November 13, 1952, with her mother, Margaret Weiss (Marliese Oppá or Oppe), and her two brothers and maternal grandmother on the French ocean liner Ile de France, which sailed from Southampton on November 7, 1952. Her father, Paul Weiss, a noted British mathematician of German descent, had already arrived in the U.S. in September 1950 and was living in Syracuse, NY. Weiss was naturalized a U.S. citizen on April 28, 1964.

== Career and accomplishments ==
While working for Bell Labs in the 1950s and 1960s, Weiss co-developed, with Richard Hamming, the L2 interpretive floating point package. The L2 system was widely used within Bell Labs, and also by outside users, who knew it as Bell 2. It was superseded by Fortran when the IBM 650 was replaced by the IBM 704 in 1957. At Bell Labs she also worked on development of the Multics operating system.

Weiss's 1966 paper on her BE VISION software for the IBM 7090 describes hidden-line removal in curved surfaces, a challenging problem at the time. This paper was acknowledged by inclusion in a 1998 compilation by SIGGRAPH of the seminal papers in computer graphics. According to Carlson, "Ruth Weiss created in 1964 (published in 1966) some of the first algorithms for converting equations of surfaces to orthographic views on an output device." In a 1966 paper, Ivan E. Sutherland stated that the problem of hidden-line removal remained unsolved for surfaces other than planes. Two months later, Weiss corrected him in a letter to the same publication, citing her work in hidden-line removal in quadric surfaces.
