= Paul Weiss (mathematician) =

German and British mathematician and physicist

- Born: 9 April 1911; Sagan, German Empire
- Died: 19 January 1991 (aged 79); Detroit, United States
- Citizenship: German, British
- Education: University of Göttingen
- Scientific career
- Fields: mathematical physics
- Doctoral advisor: Max Born, Paul Dirac

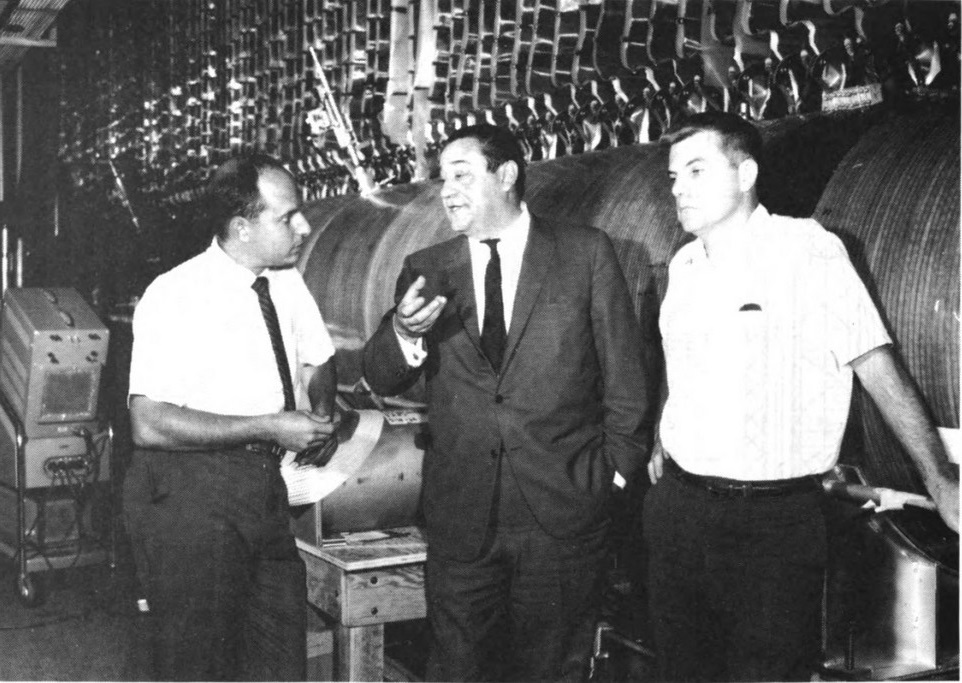
Weiss, Nicholas Christofilos, and Eugene Laurer in front of the Astron (fusion reactor)

Paul Weiss (9 April 1911 – 19 January 1991) was a German and British mathematician and theoretical physicist, pioneer of canonical quantization of field theories.

== Biography ==
Paul Weiss was born in Sagan in the German part of Silesia (now in Poland) into a wealthy Jewish industrialist family. In 1929–1933 he was educated at the University of Göttingen, where he became a pupil of Max Born, with a break for the academic year 1930–31, when he worked as a school teacher; he also studied in Paris and Zurich for some time. After the Nazis came to power, Born left Germany and invited Weiss to the University of Cambridge; Weiss joined Born in the autumn of 1933 (his mother and sister had already moved to England). After Born moved to Edinburgh, the young scientist continued work under the direction of Paul Dirac and in 1936 received his PhD with a thesis "The Notion of Conjugate Variables in the Calculus of Variations for Multiple Integrals and its Application to the Quantisation of Field Physics". In the thesis and several subsequent publications, Weiss has developed a scheme of canonical quantization of field theories, in particular, he generalized commutation relations for the field variables. He focused primarily on general mathematical formalism for the quantization of field theories. Weiss's method (the so-called parameter formalism), based on the analysis of the parameters labelling an arbitrary hypersurface, was used by Dirac in the late 1940s to develop canonical quantization of constrained Hamiltonian systems, and later – for the development of the canonical quantum gravity (first of all, in the works of Peter Bergmann and Bryce DeWitt).

After defending his thesis, Weiss stayed for two years in Cambridge, including the 1937/38 academic year, when he taught a course in quantum electrodynamics. Then there were two semesters spent in the Queen's University Belfast, where he lectured on mathematical mechanics. During this time, he wrote a long article giving the quaternion equations for the special relativity and for the motion of a charged particle emitting electromagnetic radiation. After the Second World War broke out, on 5 September 1939, Weiss expressed his desire to work for national defense. However, at that time, he did not have British citizenship, so on 12 May 1940, during a visit to Cambridge he was interned and in July sent to a special camp in Quebec. There he, along with many colleagues (Max Perutz, Hermann Bondi, Walter Heitler, Klaus Fuchs) lectured at the improvised university organized by interned scientists. Meanwhile, his sister Helene with the help of the Society for the Protection of Science and Learning has taken a number of steps to bring back her brother; Born, Dirac, Paul Ewald, Ralph Fowler and other colleagues wrote on his behalf. Finally, in December 1940, it was decided to release Weiss, and in January 1941 he had left the camp.

In February 1941, Weiss was appointed a lecturer in applied mathematics at Westfield College, and held this position until 1950. In August 1946, the scientist applied for citizenship and in June of the following year became a British citizen. In 1950–51 he worked for some time at the Institute for Advanced Study in Princeton and soon moved permanently to the United States. Until 1957 he worked as an applied mathematician for General Electric. One of the directions of his work at this time was the use of the methods of operations research to solve business problems. In the years 1958–1960, Weiss worked for Aviation Corporation, before joining to the mathematical faculty of Wayne State University in Detroit, where he worked until his death in 1991.

While working in London, Weiss married Marliese Oppa, they had two children. They also adopted her relative, who survived at Belsen. Their daughter Ruth worked as a programmer at Bell Labs. Weiss's sister Helene was a specialist in ancient philosophy and in Martin Heidegger's work, who was her teacher in 1920s. Another sister, Gertrud, was married to a famous psychologist Kurt Lewin.

== Select publications ==
- Weiss, Paul (1 August 1936). "On the quantization of a theory arising from a variational principle for multiple integrals with application to Born's electrodynamics". Proceedings of the Royal Society A. 156 (887): 192–220. Bibcode:1936RSPSA.156..192W. doi:10.1098/rspa.1936.0143.
- Weiss, Paul (6 December 1938). "On the Hamilton–Jacobi theory and quantization of a dynamical continuum". Proceedings of the Royal Society A. 169 (936): 102–119. Bibcode:1938RSPSA.169..102W. doi:10.1098/rspa.1938.0197.
- Weiss, Paul (6 December 1938). "On the Hamilton–Jacobi theory and quantization of generalized electrodynamics". Proceedings of the Royal Society A. 169 (936): 119–133. Bibcode:1938RSPSA.169..119W. doi:10.1098/rspa.1938.0198.
- Weiss, Paul (7 July 1941). "On some applications of quaternions to restricted relativity and classical radiation theory". Proceedings of the Royal Irish Academy, Section A. 46: 129–168. JSTOR 20490754.

== Sources ==
- Rickles, Dean; Blum, Alexander (6 October 2015). "Paul Weiss and the genesis of canonical quantization". European Physical Journal H. 40 (4–5): 469–487. Bibcode:2015EPJH...40..469R. doi:10.1140/epjh/e2015-60001-5. S2CID 119949070.
