= FOR TRANSIT =

Version of FORTRAN programming languate for IBM 650

FOR TRANSIT (also incorrectly FORTRANSIT) is a subset of the FORTRAN programming language for the IBM 650 Magnetic Drum Data-Processing Machine, developed by a group led by Bob Bemer. FORTRAN, the first high-level programming language, was developed for the IBM 704 in 1957, at the same time IBM wanted to provide something similar for customers of the older, less powerful, but popular 650—eventually over 2000 650s were sold.

FOR TRANSIT was upward compatible with 704 FORTRAN with some restrictions. For example variable names could only be five characters rather than six, and arrays could have a maximum of two dimensions instead of three.

FOR TRANSIT was a multi-pass compiler. The first pass translated the source to an intermediate language, IT (Internal Translator), written by Alan Perlis and others at the Carnegie Institute of Technology in 1957. The second pass compiled the IT into SOAP assembler code, and finally the SOAP code was assembled into the machine language object program.

FOR TRANSIT was never ported beyond the 650, as newer machines had the resources to run a full FORTRAN compiler.

The name FOR TRANSIT might have one or more of three meanings:

- FORTRAN-S(oap)-IT, describing the translation process
- FOR TRANSIT(ion), indicating that it was intended to ease upgrades to the 704
- FORTRAN's IT, in the sense of adding a FORTRAN front-end to the IT compiler
