= L1 and L2 (programming language) =

The L1 and L2 interpreted languages were developed by Bell Labs in the 1950s to provide floating-point arithmetic capabilities, simplified memory access, and other enhancements for the IBM model 650 (IBM 650) digital computer and allow users to more easily develop application-specific code for these machines.

== History ==
L1 was developed by Michael Wolontis and Dolores Leagus and was released in September 1955. Later, Richard Hamming and Ruth A. Weiss developed the L2 package which enhanced L1 by providing additional mathematical capabilities tailored to more engineering-oriented applications. L1 and L2 were widely used within Bell Labs, and also by outside users, who usually called them "Bell 1 and Bell 2." According to Bell Labs, "In the late 1950s, at least half the IBM 650s doing scientific and engineering work used either Bell 1 or Bell 2."
