= IBM 533 =

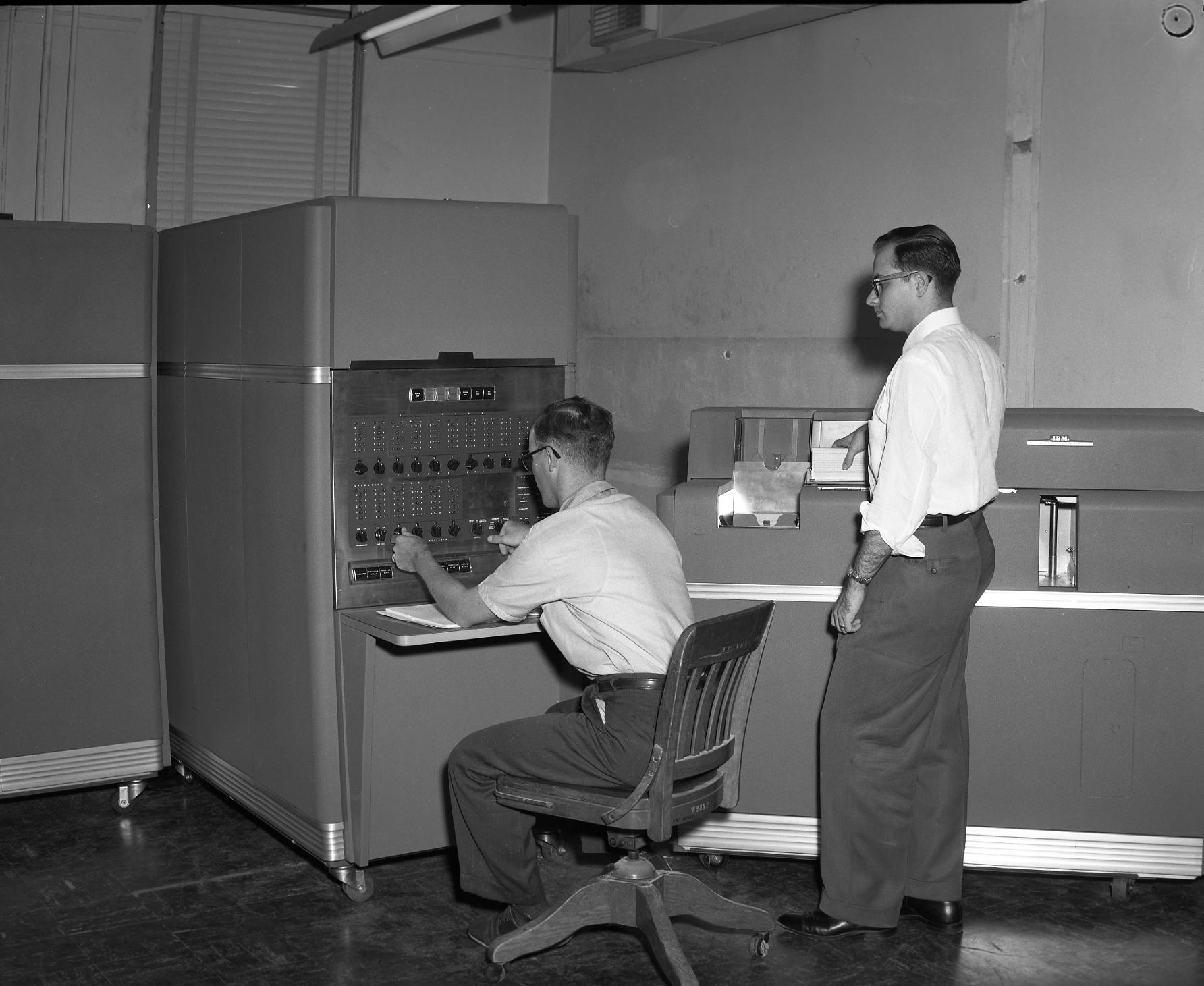
IBM 650 with IBM 533 card reader/punch at Texas A&M University in 1950s.

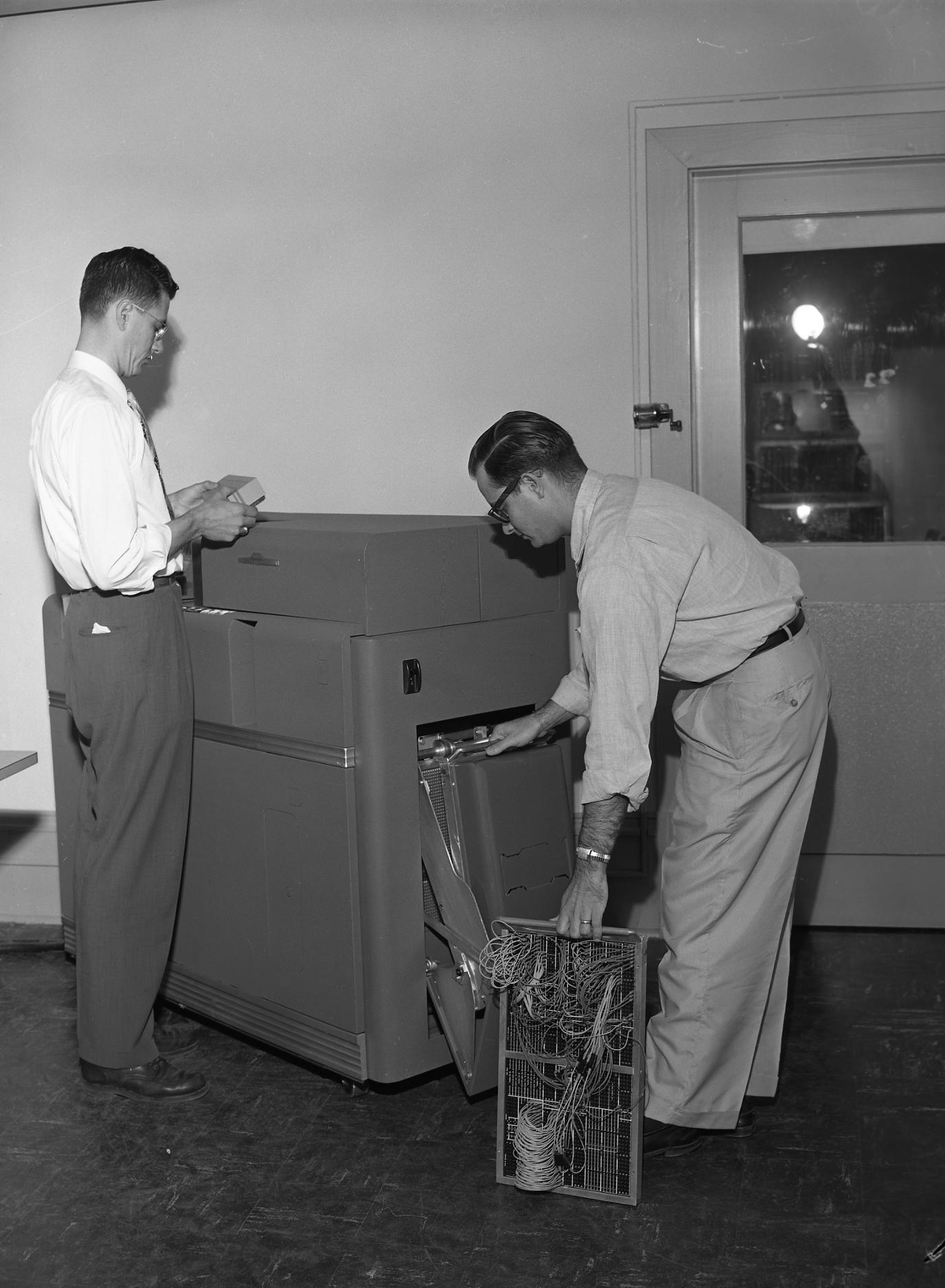
Changing control panel on IBM 533 card read/punch.

The IBM 533 Input-Output Unit, announced on July 2, 1953, was a punched card reader and punch that served as the primary input-output unit for the IBM 650 computer. It had two independent card paths, one for reading and one for punching. IBM cards were fed face down, 12-edge first. All 80 columns could be read and punched by the computer as numeric data, but alphanumeric reading was severely limited on the basic 650 and require special control panel wiring.

The 533 could punch 100 cards per minute and had a set of read brushes downstream from the punch station that were used to verify proper punching. The card reader was similar to that on the IBM 402 accounting machine and could read 200 cards per minute. The 533 was controlled by a plugboard control panel, typical of IBM unit record equipment of the time. p. 19 ff

A lower performance (and presumably cheaper) model, the IBM 537, was introduced September 4, 1956. It had a single card path for reading and punching and operated at 155 cards per minute. On January 12, 1959, IBM introduced two faster 650 peripherals, the IBM 543 Card Reader and the IBM 544 Card Punch. Both operated at up to 250 cards per minute.

All were withdrawn on August 18, 1969.
