= IBM 650 =

Vacuum-tube 1950s computer system

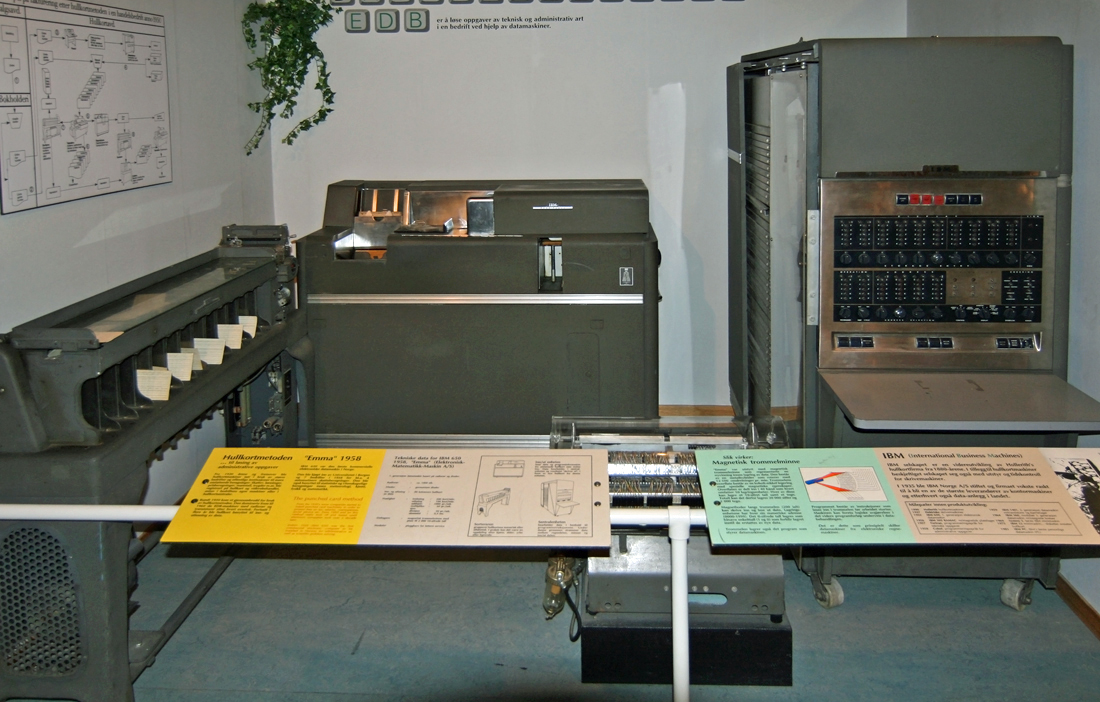
- Part of the first IBM 650 computer in Norway (1959), known as "EMMA". 650 Console Unit (right, an exterior side panel is open), 533 Card Read Punch unit (middle, input-output). 655 Power Unit is missing. Punched card sorter (left, not part of the 650). Now at Norwegian Museum of Science and Technology in Oslo.
- Type: Digital computer
- Released: 1954; 72 years ago
- Predecessor: IBM CPC (604, 605)
- Successor: IBM 7070 (hi-end); IBM 1620 (low-end)
- Related: IBM 701, IBM 702; IBM 608

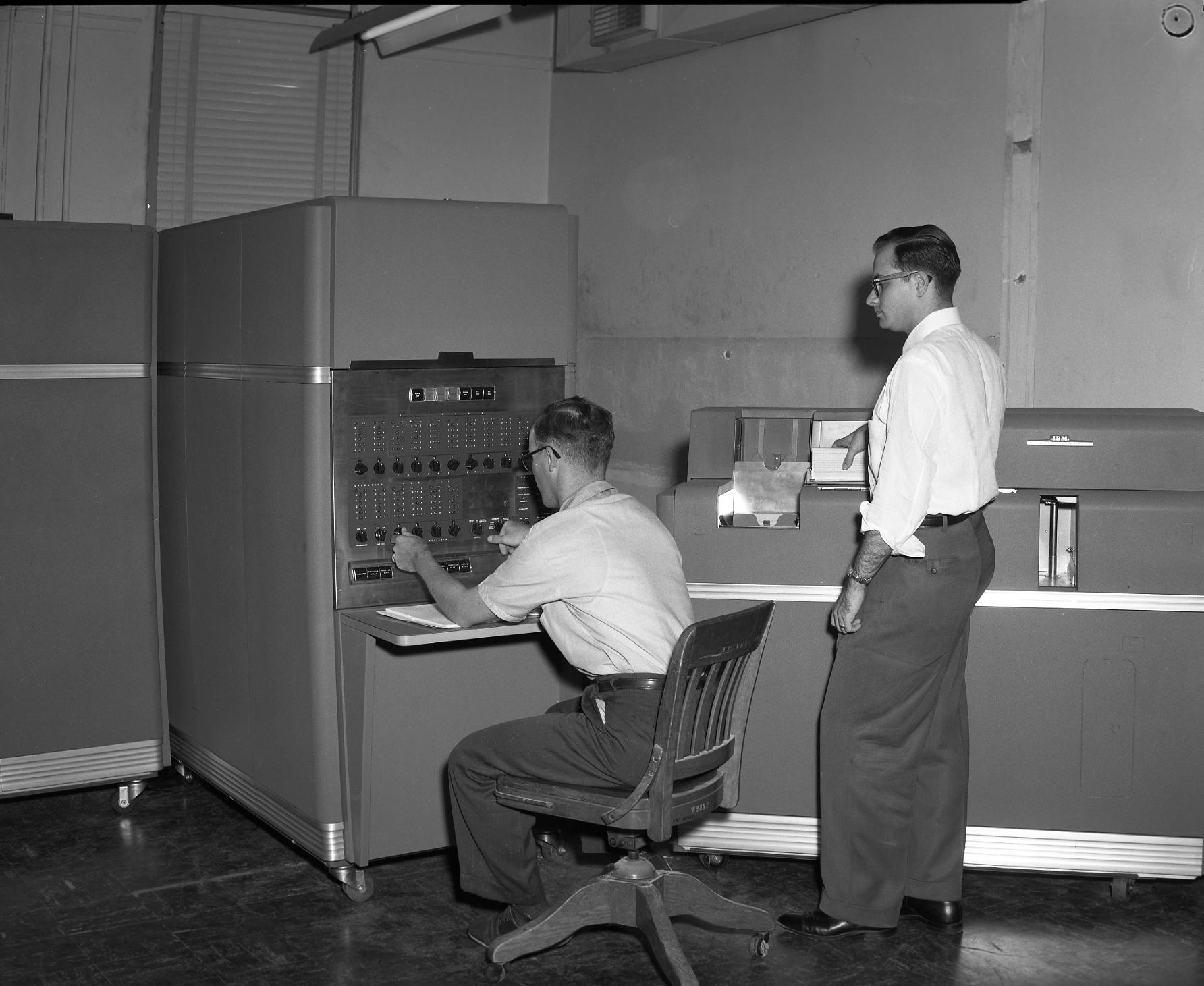
IBM 650 at Texas A&M University. The IBM 533 Card Read Punch unit is on the right.

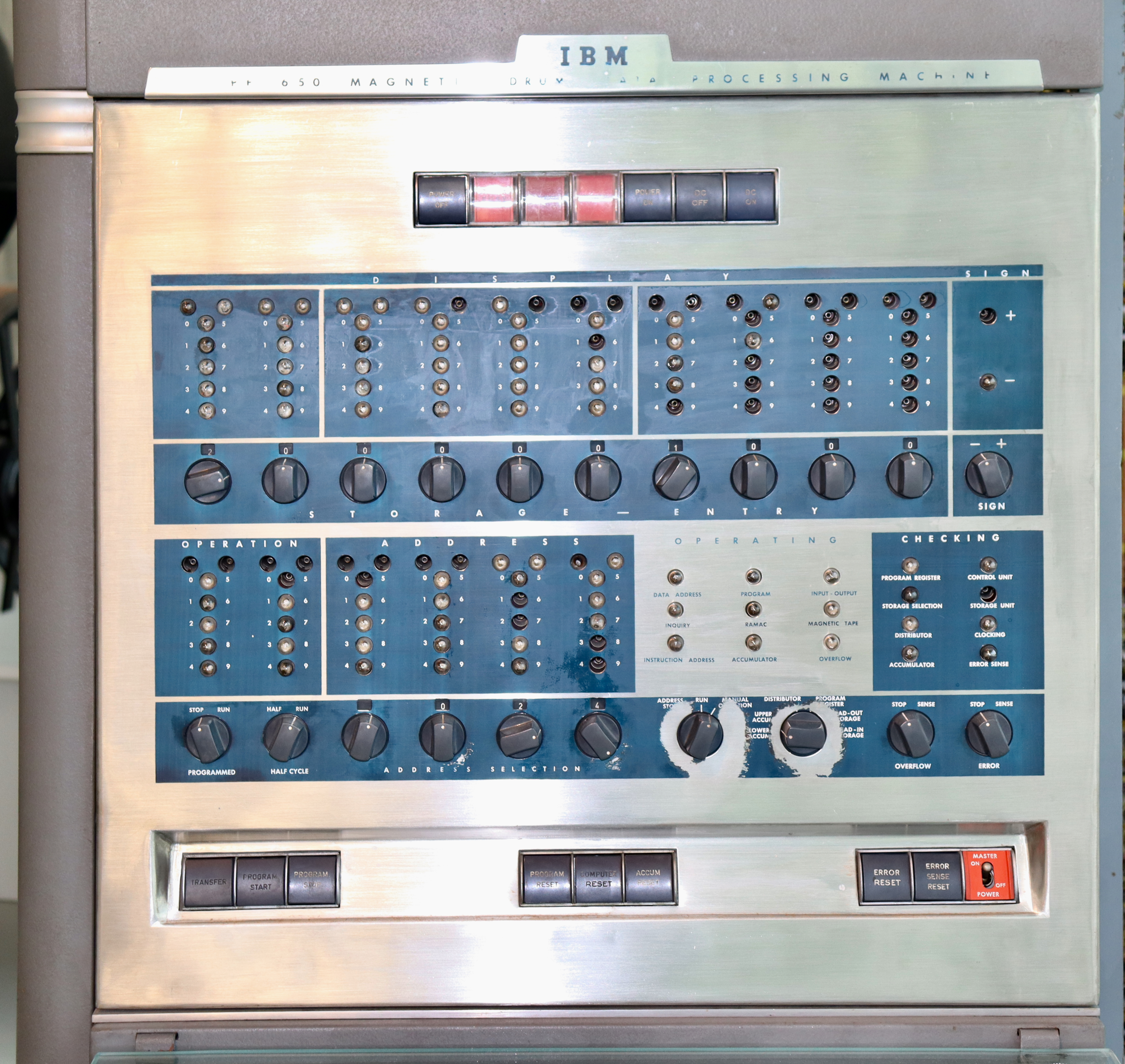
IBM 650 console panel, showing bi-quinary indicators. Note wear marks around frequently used switches, lower right. Collection of the Museo Nacional de Ciencia y Tecnología. A Coruña (Galicia, Spain).

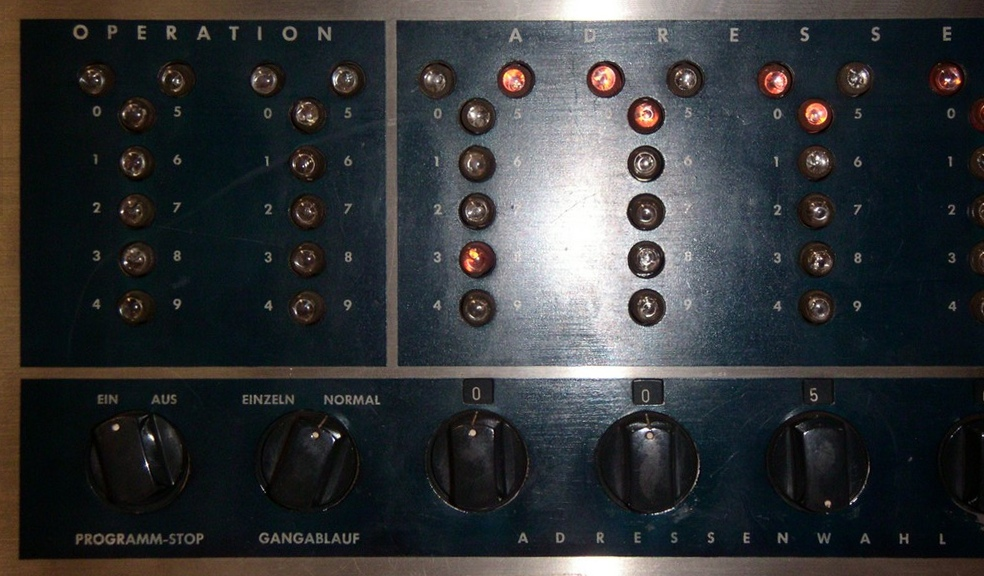
Close-up of bi-quinary indicators

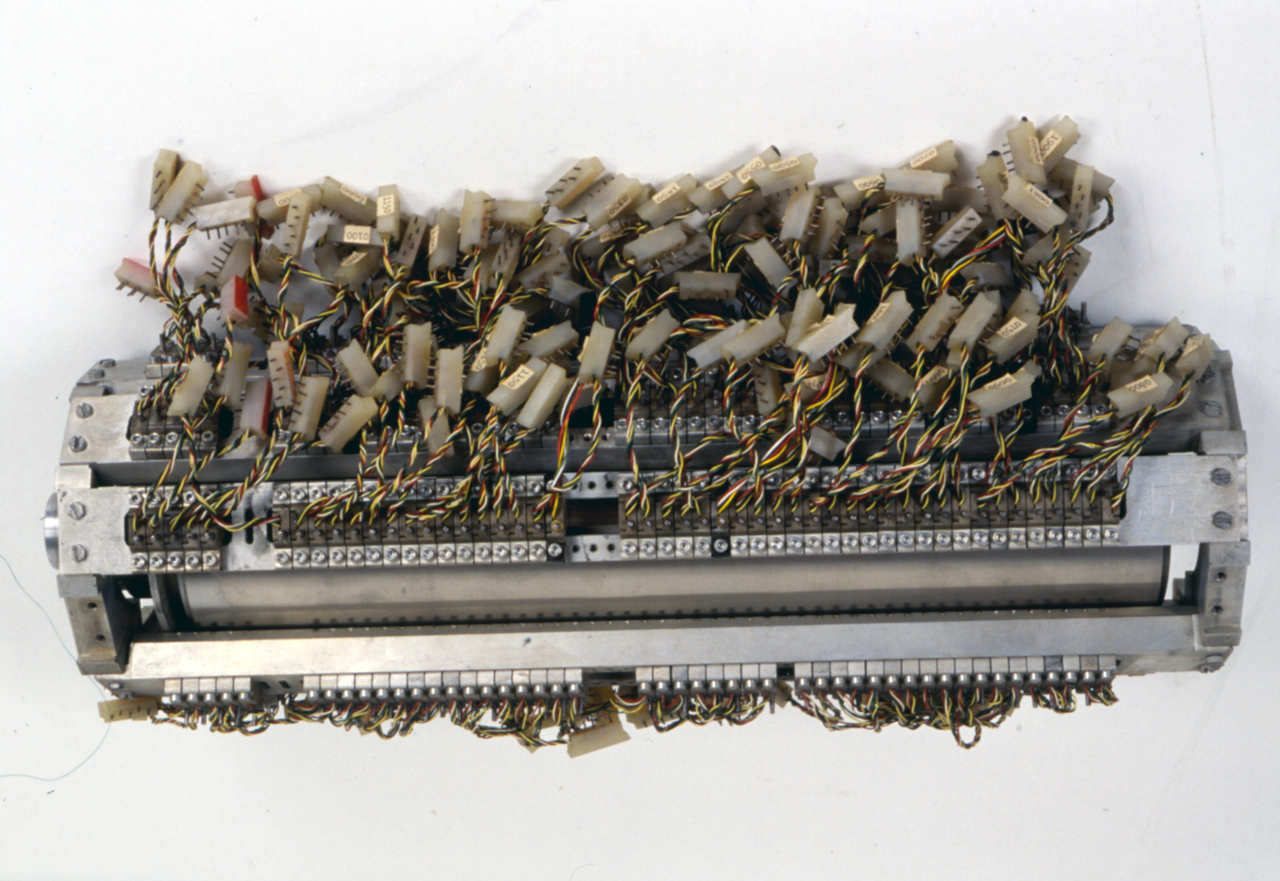
Memory drum from an IBM 650

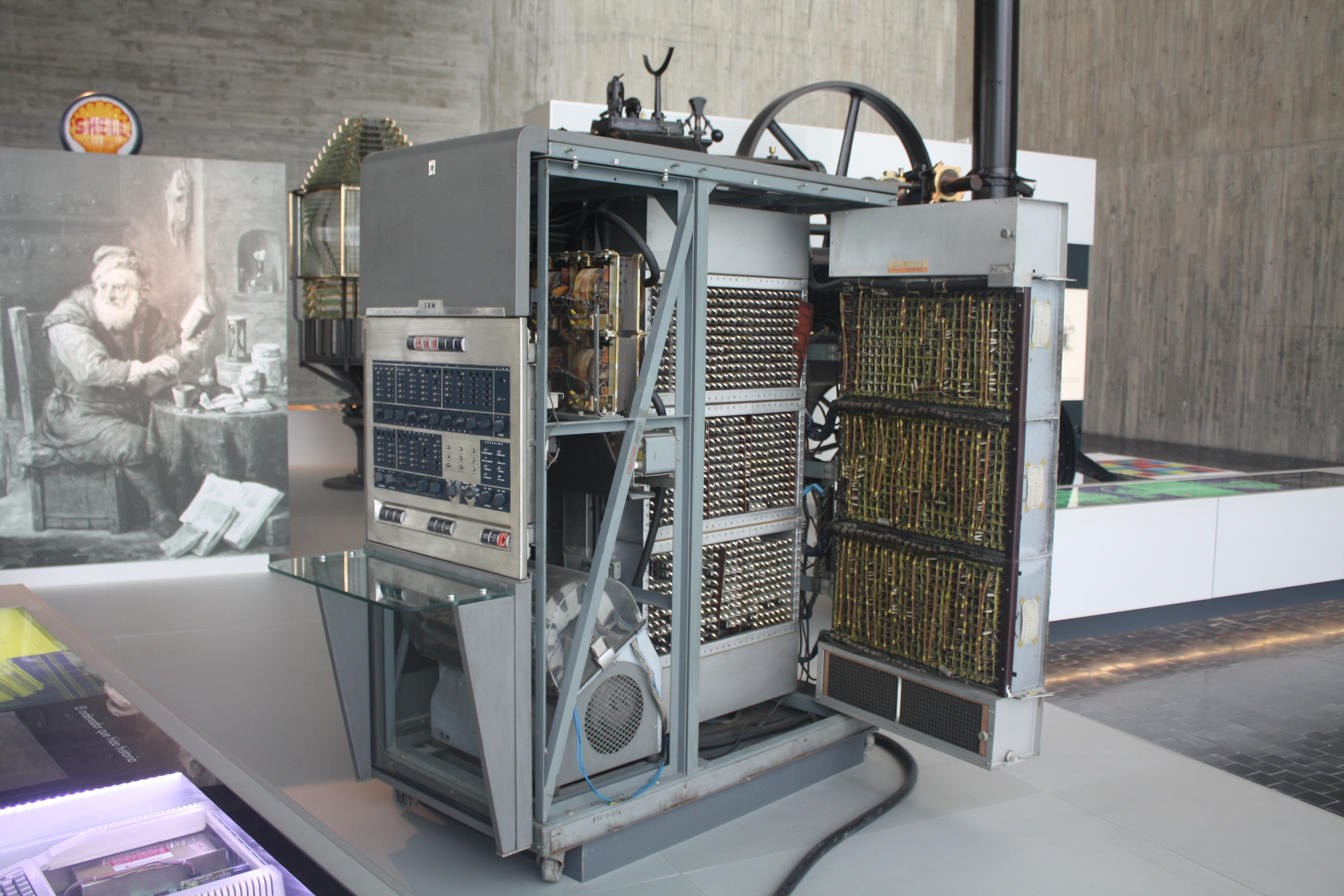
Side view of an IBM 650 Console Unit. First computer in Spain (1959) now at National Museum of Science and Technology in A Coruña

The IBM 650 Magnetic Drum Data-Processing Machine is an early digital computer produced by IBM in the mid-1950s. It was the first mass-produced computer in the world. Almost 2,000 systems were produced, the last in 1962, and it was the first computer to make a meaningful profit. The first one was installed in late 1954 and the IBM 650 was the most popular computer of the 1950s.

The 650 was offered to business, scientific and engineering users as a slower and less expensive alternative to the IBM 701 and IBM 702 computers, which were for scientific and business purposes respectively. It was also marketed to users of punched card machines who were upgrading from calculating punches, such as the IBM 604, to computers.

Because of its relatively low cost and ease of programming, the 650 was used to pioneer a wide variety of applications, from modeling submarine crew performance to teaching high school and college students computer programming. The IBM 650 became highly popular in universities, where a generation of students first learned programming.

It was announced in 1953 and in 1956 enhanced as the IBM 650 RAMAC with the addition of up to four disk storage units. The purchase price in 1959 for the bare Model 4 IBM 650 console, without the reader punch unit or power supply, was $150,000 (equivalent to about $1,700,000 in 2025). Support for the 650 and its component units was withdrawn in 1969.

The 650 was a two-address, bi-quinary coded decimal computer (both data and addresses were decimal), with memory on a rotating magnetic drum. Character support was provided by the input/output units converting punched card alphabetical and special character encodings to/from a two-digit decimal code.

The 650 was a digit-serial machine, clocked at a frequency of 125 kHz, with a basic digit time of 8 μs. Since the 650 had a 10-digit word, together with a sign, and there was a switching interval of one digit time between words, the word time, a basic unit of IBM 650 timing, was 12 digit times, or 96 μs. Since there were 50 words on each track of the drum, the drum rotated once every 50 word times (4.8 ms, or 12,500 rpm.) Instruction times varied as they depended on the time to locate the instruction data and next instruction on the drum as well as, for multiplies and divides, the digits of the multiplier and quotient. The total time for an add or subtract instruction was between 7 and 106 word times, or approximately 0.7 to 10.2 ms. Multiplies took between 23 and 253 word times and divides between 63 and 293 (2.2 to 24.3 and 6.0 to 28.1 ms.)

Donald Knuth's series of books The Art of Computer Programming is famously dedicated to a 650.

== History ==
The first 650 was installed on December 8, 1954 in the controller's department of the John Hancock Mutual Life Insurance Company in Boston.

The IBM 7070 (signed 10-digit decimal words), announced 1958, was expected to be a "common successor to at least the 650 and the [IBM] 705". The IBM 1620 (variable-length decimal), introduced in 1959, addressed the lower end of the market. The UNIVAC Solid State (a two-address computer, signed 10-digit decimal words) was announced by Sperry Rand in December 1958 as a response to the 650. None of these had an instruction set that was compatible with the 650.

== Hardware ==
The basic 650 system consisted of three units:

- IBM 650 Console Unit housed the magnetic drum storage, arithmetical device (using vacuum tubes) and the operator's console.
- IBM 655 Power Unit
- IBM 533 or IBM 537 Card Read Punch Unit The IBM 533 had separate feeds for reading and punching; the IBM 537 had one feed, thus could read and then punch into the same card.

Weight: 5,400–6,263 pounds (2.7–3.1 short tons; 2.4–2.8 t).

Optional units:

- IBM 46 Tape To Card Punch, Model 3
- IBM 47 Tape To Card Printing Punch, Model 3
- IBM 355 Disk Storage Unit Systems with a disk unit were known as IBM 650 RAMAC Data Processing Systems
- IBM 407 Accounting Machine
- IBM 543 Card Reader Unit
- IBM 544 Card Punch Unit
- IBM 652 Control Unit (magnetic tape, disk)
- IBM 653 Storage Unit (magnetic tape, disk, core storage, index registers, floating-point arithmetic)
- IBM 654 Auxiliary Alphabetic Unit
- IBM 727 Magnetic Tape Unit
- IBM 838 Inquiry Station

=== Main memory ===
Rotating drum memory provided 1,000, 2,000, or 4,000 words of memory at addresses 0000 to 0999, 1999, or 3999 respectively. Each word had 10 bi-quinary coded decimal digits, representing a signed 10-digit number or five characters. (Counting a bi-quinary coded digit as seven bits, 4000 words would be equivalent to 35 kilobytes.) Words on the drums were organized in bands around the drum, fifty words per band, and 20, 40, or 80 bands for the respective models. A word could be accessed when its location on the drum surface passed under the read/write heads during rotation (rotating at 12,500 rpm, the non-optimized average access time was 2.5 ms). Because of this timing, the second address in each instruction was the address of the next instruction. Programs could then be optimized by placing instructions at addresses that would be immediately accessible when execution of the previous instruction was completed. IBM provided a form with ten columns and 200 rows to allow programmers to keep track of where they put instructions and data. Later an assembler, SOAP (Symbolic Optimal Assembly Program), was provided that performed rough optimization.

The LGP-30, Bendix G-15 and IBM 305 RAMAC computers used vacuum tubes and drum memory too, but they were quite different from the IBM 650.

Instructions read from the drum went to a program register (in current terminology, an instruction register). Data read from the drum went through a 10-digit distributor. The 650 had a 20-digit accumulator, divided into 10-digit lower and upper accumulators with a common sign. Arithmetic was performed by a one-digit adder. The console (10 digit switches, one sign switch, and 10 bi-quinary display lights), distributor, lower and upper accumulators were all addressable; 8000, 8001, 8002, 8003 respectively.

=== IBM 653 Storage Unit ===
The optional IBM 653 Storage Unit, was introduced on May 3, 1955, ultimately providing up to five features:

- Magnetic tape controller (for IBM 727 Magnetic Tape units) (10 extra operation codes)
- Disk storage controller (1956 enhancement for then new IBM 355 Disk Storage Unit) (five extra operation codes)
- Sixty 10-digit words of magnetic core memory at addresses 9000 to 9059. This small fast memory had an access time of 96μs, a 26-fold improvement relative to the rotating drum. This feature added five operation codes and was needed as a buffer for tape and disk I/O. The 60 words could also be used by programs to speed up inner loops and table lookups.
- Three four-digit index registers at addresses 8005 to 8007; drum addresses were indexed by adding 2000, 4000 or 6000 to them, core addresses were indexed by adding 0200, 0400 or 0600 to them. If the system had the 4000 word drum then indexing was by adding 4000 to the first address for index register A, adding 4000 to the second address for index register B, and by adding 4000 to each of the two addresses for index register C (the indexing for 4000-word systems only applied to the first address). The 4000-word systems required transistorized read/write circuitry for the drum memory and were available before 1963. (18 extra operation codes)
- Floating point – arithmetic instructions supported an eight-digit mantissa and two-digit characteristic (offset exponent) – MMMMMMMMCC, providing a range of ±0.00000001E-50 to ±0.99999999E+49. (seven extra operation codes)

== Instruction set ==
The 650 instructions consisted of a two-digit operation code, a four-digit data address and the four-digit address of the next instruction. The sign was ignored on the basic machine, but was used on machines with optional features. The base machine had 44 operation codes. Additional operation codes were provided for options, such as floating point, core storage, index registers and additional I/O devices. With all options installed, there were 97 operation codes.

The Table lookup (TLU) instruction could high-equal compare a referenced 10-digit word with 48 consecutive words on the same drum band in one 5ms revolution and then switch to the next band in time for the next 48 words. This feat was about one-third the speed of a one-thousand times faster binary machine in 1963 (1,500 microseconds on the IBM 7040 to 5,000 microseconds on the 650) for looking up 46 entries as long as both were programmed in assembler. There was an optional Table lookup Equal instruction, with the same performance.

The Read (RD) instruction read an 80-column card of numeric data into ten memory words; the distribution of digits to words determined by the card reader's control panel wiring. When used with the 533 Reader Punch unit's Alphabetic device, a combination of numeric and alphanumeric columns (maximum of 30 alphanumeric columns) could be read. An expansion feature allowed more alphanumeric columns but certainly not over 50, as only ten words (five characters per word) were stored on the drum by a card read operation.

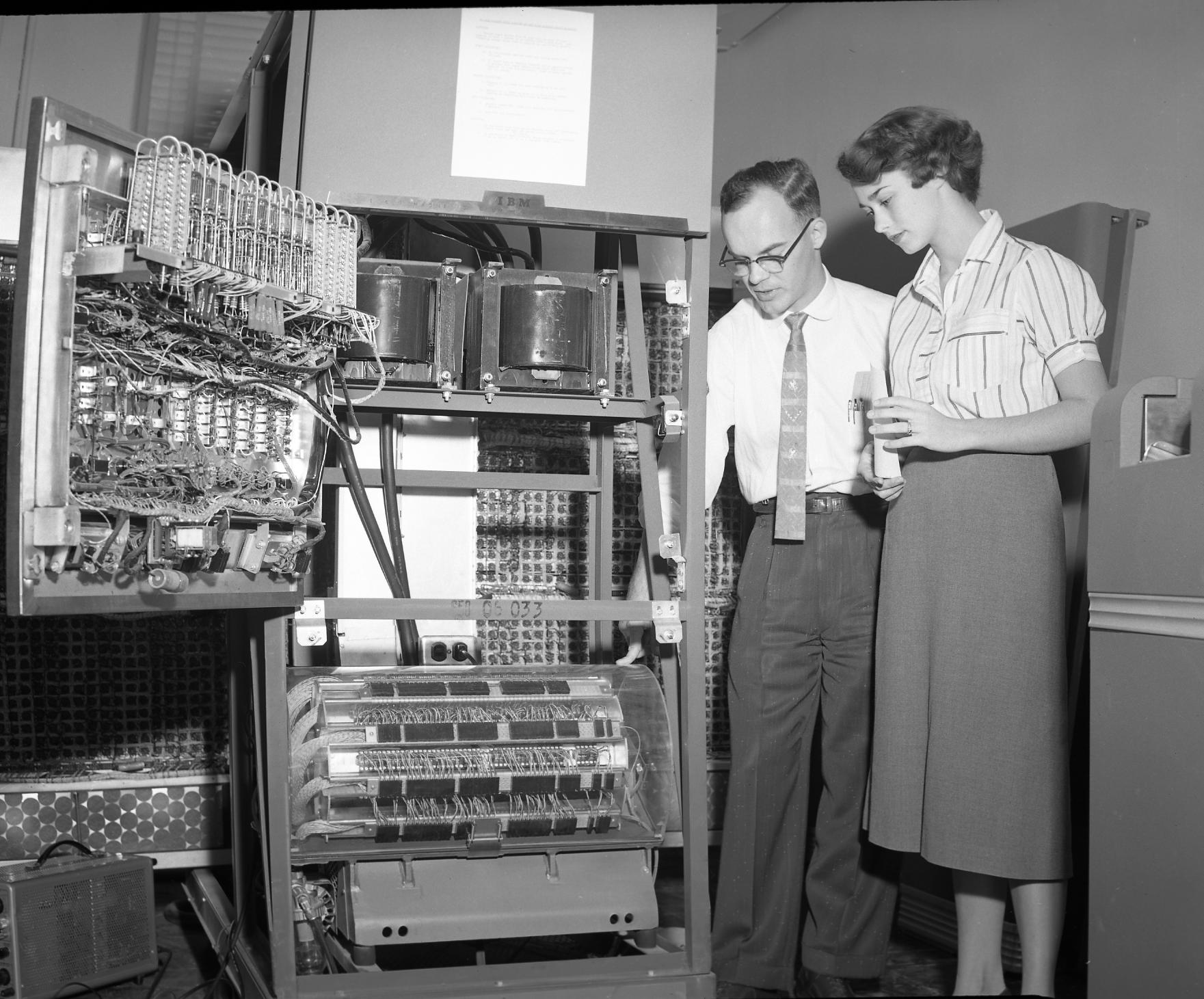
IBM 650 at Texas A&M, opened up to show rear of front panel, vacuum tube modules and storage drum

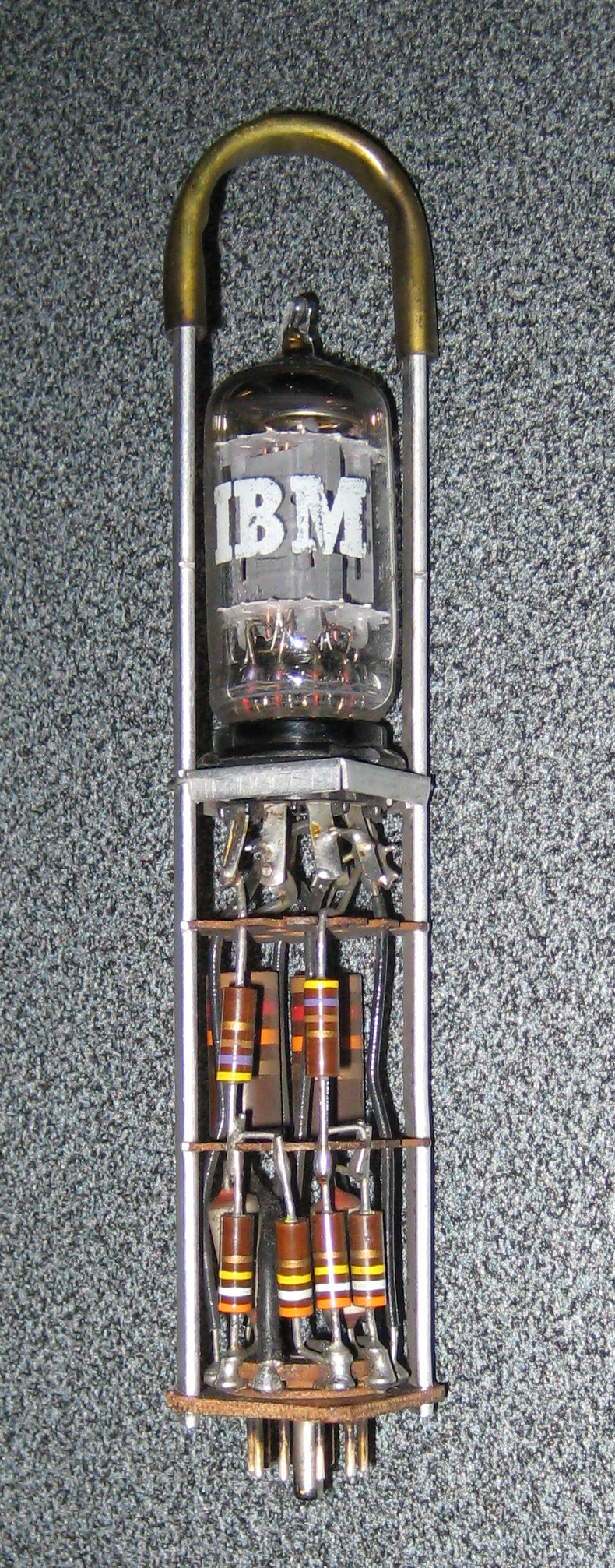
Vacuum tube circuit module of type used in the 650

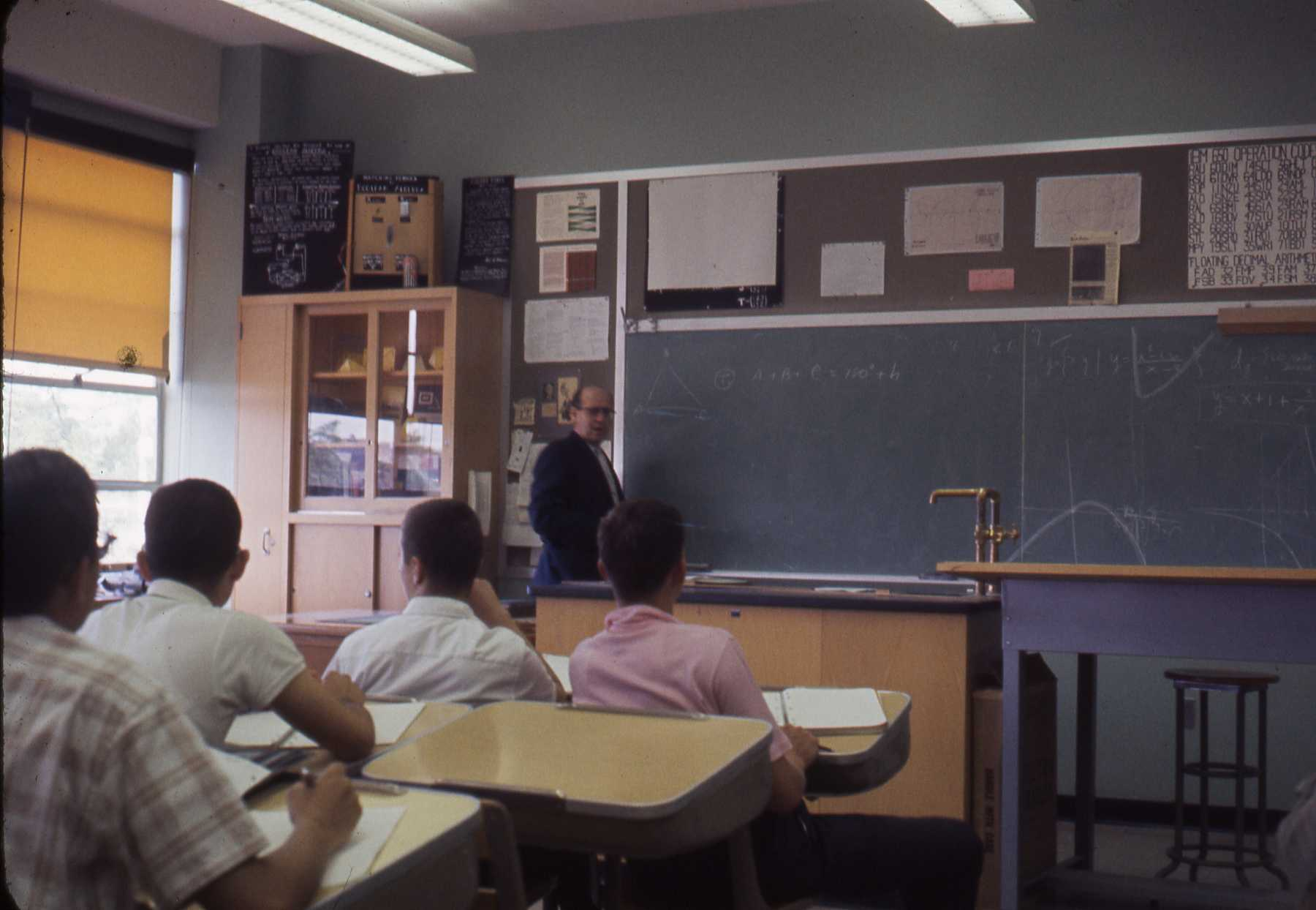
A classroom in 1960 at the Bronx High School of Science with IBM 650 instruction chart above blackboard, upper right

The base machine operation codes were:

17	AABL	Add absolute to lower accumulator
15	AL	Add to lower accumulator
10	AU	Add to upper accumulator
45	BRNZ	Branch on accumulator non-zero
46	BRMIN	Branch on minus accumulator
44	BRNZU	Branch on non-zero in upper accumulator
47	BROV	Branch on overflow
90-99	BRD	Branch on 8 in distributor positions 1-10 (Note: Used to allow 533 control panel to signal CPU.)
14	DIV	Divide
64	DIVRU	Divide and reset upper accumulator
69	LD	Load distributor
19	MULT	Multiply
00	NO-OP	No operation
71	PCH	Punch a card
70	RD	Read a card
67	RAABL	Reset accumulator and add absolute to lower accumulator
65	RAL	Reset accumulator and add to lower accumulator
60	RAU	Reset accumulator and add to upper accumulator
68	RSABL	Reset accumulator and subtract absolute from lower accumulator
66	RSL	Reset accumulator and subtract from lower accumulator
61	RSU	Reset accumulator and subtract from upper accumulator
35	SLT	Shift accumulator left
36	SCT	Shift accumulator left and count (Note: Counts high-order zeros in upper accumulator.)
30	SRT	Shift accumulator right
31	SRD	Shift accumulator right and round accumulator
01	STOP	Stop if console switch is set to stop, otherwise continue as a NO-OP
24	STD	Store distributor into memory
22	STDA	Store lower accumulator data address into distributor Then store distributor into memory
23	STIA	Store lower accumulator instruction address into distributor Then store distributor into memory
20	STL	Store lower accumulator into memory
21	STU	Store upper accumulator into memory. (Note: Value stored takes sign of accumulator, except after a divide operation; then sign of remainder is stored.)
18	SABL	Subtract absolute from lower accumulator
16	SL	Subtract from lower accumulator
11	SU	Subtract from upper accumulator
84	TLU	Table lookup

Notes:

The IBM 653 options could implement additional instruction codes.

== Sample program ==
This one-card program, taken from the 650 Programming Bulletin 5, IBM, 1956, 22-6314-0, will set most of the drum storage to minus zeros. The program includes examples of instructions being executed from the console switches and from an accumulator.

To begin, a load card is keypunched with 80 consecutive digits (the second column below) so that, when read, drum locations 0001 through 0008 contents will be as shown.

    0001 0000010000
    0002 0000000000-
    0003 1000018003
    0004 6100080007
    0005 2400008003
    0006 0100008000
    0007 6900060005
    0008 2019990003

The console digit switches (address 8000) are manually set to a Read instruction with data address 0004.

    loc-       op|data|next
    ation        |addr|instruction
                 |    |addr

    8000  RD   70 0004 xxxx  Read load card into first band read area

Each drum band has a read area; these read areas are in locations 0001-0010, 0051-0060, 0101-0110 and so on. Any address in a band can be used to identify that band for a read instruction; the address 0004 identifies the first band. Execution begins then, from the console with the reading of the eight words on the load card into locations 0001-0008 of the first memory band. In the case of reading a load card, the "next instruction address" is taken from the data address field, not the next instruction address field (shown above as xxxx). Thus execution continues at 0004

    0004  RSU  61 0008 0007  Reset entire accumulator, subtract into upper (8003) the value 2019990003
    0007  LD   69 0006 0005  Load distributor with 0100008000
    0005  STD  24 0000 8003  Store distributor in location 0000, next instruction is in 8003 (the upper accumulator)
                             Note: the moving of data or instructions from one drum location to another
                               requires two instructions: LD, STD.

Now a two-instruction loop executes:

    8003  STL  20 1999 0003  Store lower accumulator (that accumulator was reset to 0- by the RSU instruction above)
                             The "1999" data address is decremented, below, on each iteration.
                             This instruction was placed in the upper accumulator by the RSU instruction above.
                             Note: this instruction, now in the upper accumulator, will be decremented and then
                               executed again while still in the accumulator.

    0003  AU   10 0001 8003  Decrement data address of the instruction in the accumulator by 1
                             (by adding 10000 to a negative number)

The STL's data address will, eventually, be decremented to 0003, and the AU ... instruction at 0003 will be overwritten with zeros. When that occurs (the STL's next instruction address remains 0003) execution continues as follows:

    0003  NOOP 00 0000 0000  No-operation instruction, next instruction address is 0000
    0000  HALT 01 0000 8000  Halt, next instruction address is the console
                             (this Halt instruction was stored in 0000 by the STD instruction above)

== Software ==
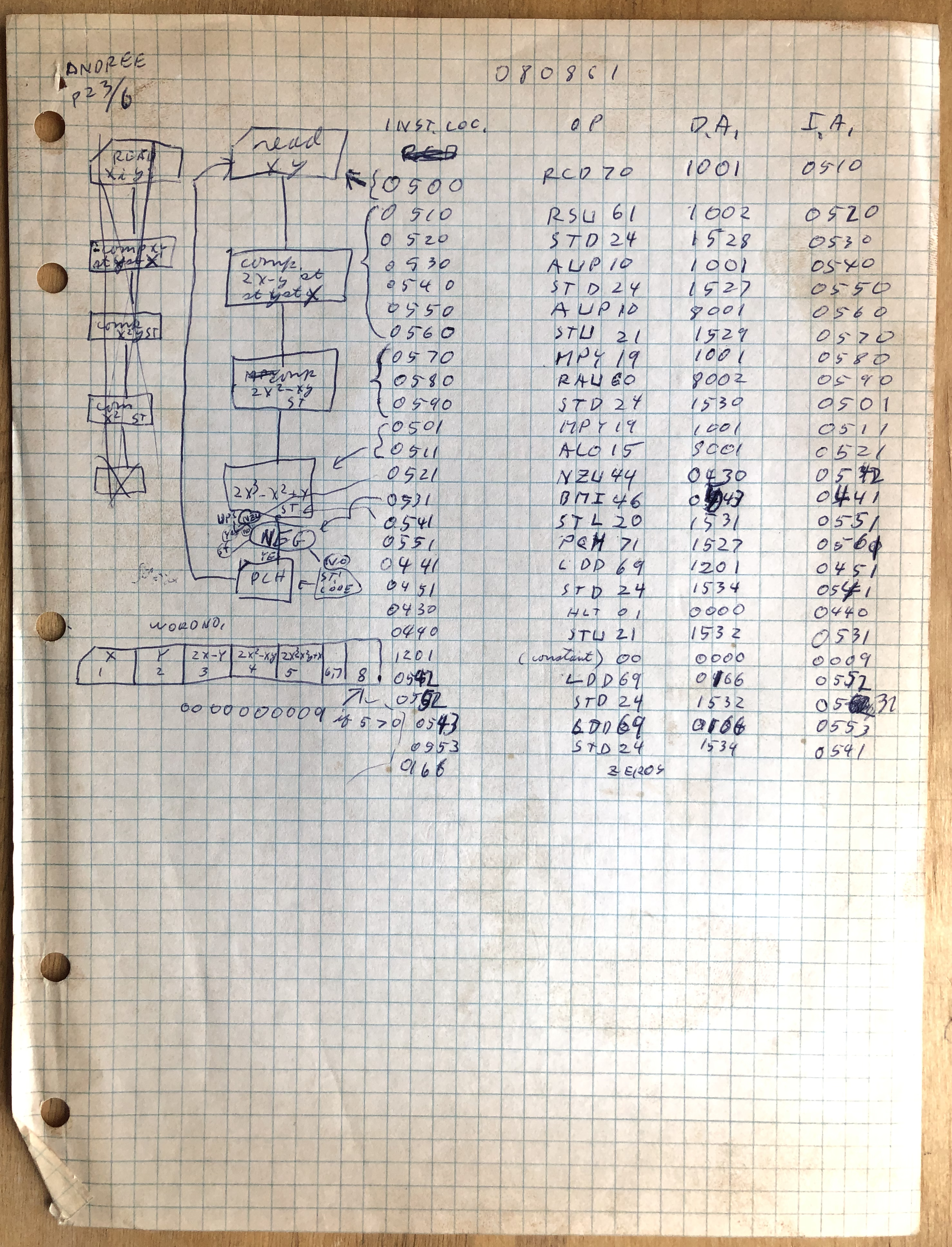
Student program from 1961 written in IBM 650 machine language, based on an exercise in Andree's book

The 650 instruction set is simple enough that small programs could be written in machine language and this was common for student exercises. There was a single-instruction-per-card format that could be loaded directly into the machine and executed.

Machine language was awkward for large programs and, over time, a variety of programming languages and tools were written for the IBM 650. These included:

Assemblers

- Symbolic Optimal Assembly Program (SOAP) — An assembler
- Technical Assembly System (TASS) — A macro assembler.

Interpretive systems

- An Interpretive application virtual machine package originally published as "Complete Floating Decimal Interpretive System for the IBM 650 Magnetic Drum Calculator". This was known by several names:
  - the Wolontis–Bell Labs Interpreter, the Bell System, the Bell interpreter, the Bell interpretive system, or BLIS — the Bell Lab Interpretive System
  - L1 and (later) L2 – known outside Bell Labs as "Bell 1" and "Bell 2", among other names (see above)
- IPL-V — A list-processing language.
- Synthetic Programming System for Commercial Applications

Algebraic languages / compilers

- Internal Translator (IT) — A compiler
- Revised Unified New Compiler IT Basic Language Extended (RUNCIBLE) — An extension of IT at Case
- FOR TRANSIT — A version of Fortran which compiled to IT which in turn was compiled to SOAP
- FORTRAN
- GATE — A simple compiler with one character variable names
- SPACE (Simplified Programming Anyone Can Enjoy) — A business-oriented two-step compiler through SOAP

== See also ==
- Ferranti Mark 1
- History of IBM - 1946–1959: Postwar
- IBM 700/7000 series
- Bull Gamma 3, one of the main competitors to the IBM 650
- LEO (computer)
- List of vacuum-tube computers
- Short Code
- UNIVAC I
- UNIVAC Solid State announced by Sperry Rand in December 1958 as a response to the IBM 650. In June 1959, Remington Rand announced that it had written an IBM 650 emulator program to ease conversion.
